This is a complete list of all 1558 Statutory Instruments published in the United Kingdom in the year 1988.


Statutory Instruments

1-100
Origin of Goods (Petroleum Products) Regulations 1988 SI 1988/1
Export of Sheep (Prohibition) (No.2) Amendment Order 1988 SI 1988/6
Food Protection (Emergency Prohibitions) (England) Amendment Order 1988 SI 1988/7
National Health Service (Charges to Overseas Visitors) Amendment Regulations 1988 SI 1988/8
Food Protection (Emergency Prohibitions) (Wales) (No.5) Amendment Order 1988 SI 1988/9
Housing (Improvement of Amenities of Residential Areas) (Scotland) Order 1988 SI 1988/10
Food Protection (Emergency Prohibitions) Order 1988 Approved by both Houses of Parliament SI 1988/11
National Health Service (Charges to Overseas Visitors) (Scotland) Amendment Regulations 1988 SI 1988/13
Amusements with Prizes (Variation of Fees) Order 1988 SI 1988/14
Gaming Act (Variation of Fees) Order 1988 SI 1988/15
A40 London—Fishguard Trunk Road (Long Lane Junction Improvement Trunk Road and Slip Roads) Order 1988 SI 1988/18
Local Government (Rate Product) (Scotland) Amendment Regulations 1988 SI 1988/19
Highland Regional Council (Abhainn Shlatach) Water Order 1988 SI 1988/20
Highland Regional Council (Loch an t-Seana Bhaile) (Amendment) Water Order 1988 SI 1988/21
Building Societies (Designated Capital Resources) Order 1988 SI 1988/22
Building Societies (Designation of Relevant Estate Agencies) Order 1988 SI 1988/23
Gipsy Encampments (The Borough of North Bedfordshire and the District of Mid Bedfordshire) Order 1988 SI 1988/26
Assured Tenancies (Approved Bodies) (No.1) Order 1988 SI 1988/28
Diplomatic and Consular Premises Act 1987|Diplomatic and Consular Premises (Cambodia) Order 1988  SI 1988/30
Fire Services (Appointments and Promotion) (Amendment) Regulations 1988 SI 1988/31
Common Parts Grant (Rateable Value Limits) Order 1988 SI 1988/32
Grants by Local Housing Authorities (Appropriate Percentage and Exchequer Contributions) Order 1988 SI 1988/33
Social Fund (Application for Review) Regulations 1988 SI 1988/34
Social Fund (Recovery by Deductions from Benefits) Regulations 1988 SI 1988/35
Social Fund Maternity and Funeral Expenses (General) Amendment Regulations 1988 SI 1988/36
British Film Fund Agency (Dissolution) Order 1988 SI 1988/37
Fishing Vessels (Life-Saving Appliances) Regulations 1988 SI 1988/38
M40 London-Oxford-Birmingham Motorway (Waterstock to Warwick Section) and Connecting Roads (No. 1) Scheme 1984 Variation (No. 2) Scheme 1988 SI 1988/39
A46 (Coventry Eastern Bypass Slip Roads) Order 1988 SI 1988/40
Financial Services Act 1986 (Occupational Pension Schemes) Order 1988 SI 1988/41
Anatomy Regulations 1988 SI 1988/44
Disposal of Waste (Control of Beet Rhizomania Disease) Order 1988 SI 1988/45
Thames Water Authority (Repeal of Local Enactments) Order 1988 SI 1988/46
Wireless Telegraphy (Content of Transmission) Regulations 1988 SI 1988/47
City of Edinburgh and East Lothian Districts (Newhailes) Boundaries Amendment Order 1988 SI 1988/48 (S. 6)
East Lothian and Midlothian Districts (Marldene) Boundaries Amendment Order 1988 SI 1988/49 (S. 7)
Kirkcaldy and Dunfermline Districts (Ballingry) Boundaries Amendment Order 1988 SI 1988/50 (S. 8)
Disabled Persons (Services, Consultation and Representation) Act 1986 (Commencement No. 4) Order 1988 SI 1988/51
Newcastle and Gateshead Water Order 1988 SI 1988/56
A20 Trunk Road (Sidcup Bypass, Bexley and Bromley) (Speed Limits) Order 1988 SI 1988/57
Nottinghamshire (District Boundaries) Order 1988 SI 1988/61
 The King's Lynn and West Norfolk District (Parishes) Order 1988 S.I. 1988/62
(A1) London—Edinburgh—Thurso Trunk Road (Newcastle Western Bypass and Slip Roads) Order 1986 (Variation) Order 1988 SI 1988/64
Inner London Education Area (Electoral Arrangements) Order 1988 SI 1988/65
Local Government (Miscellaneous Provisions) Act 1982 (Repeal of Local Acts) Order 1988 SI 1988/66
Channel Tunnel Act (Competition) Order 1988 SI 1988/67
Channel Tunnel Act (Competition) (No. 2) Order 1988 SI 1988/68
Reservoirs Act 1975 (Application Fees) (Amendment) Regulations 1988 SI 1988/69
Cheshire (District Boundaries) Order 1988 SI 1988/70
Derbyshire (District Boundaries) Order 1988 SI 1988/71
Cowes Harbour Revision Order 1988 SI 1988/72
(A174) Parkway Interchange to ICI Westgate Roundabout (Trunking) Order 1988 SI 1988/73
Sea Fishing (Enforcement of Community Conservation Measures) (Amendment) Order 1988 SI 1988/77
North West Water Authority (Wilmslow and Alderley Edge) Order 1988 SI 1988/78
South West Water Authority (River Wolf Discharge) Order 1988 SI 1988/79
Registration of Births, Deaths, Marriages and Divorces (Fees) (Scotland) Regulations 1988 SI 1988/80
Anatomy Act 1984 (Commencement) Order 1988 SI 1988/81
Home Purchase Assistance (Recognised Lending Institutions) (No. 1) Order 1988 SI 1988/84
Housing (Right to Buy) (Priority of Charges) (No. 1) Order 1988 SI 1988/85
Mortgage Indemnities (Recognised Bodies) (No. 1) Order 1988 SI 1988/87
Double Taxation Relief (Taxes on Income) (Foreign Loan Interest) Regulations 1988 SI 1988/88
Prison (Amendment) Rules 1988 SI 1988/89
Industrial Training Levy (Construction Board) Order 1988 SI 1988/90
Department of Trade and Industry (Fees) Order 1988 SI 1988/93
Disabled Persons (Services, Consultation and Representation) Act 1986 (Commencement No.5) (Scotland) Order 1988 SI 1988/94
Insolvency Fees (Amendment) Order 1988 SI 1988/95
Cardiff-Glan Conwy Trunk Road A470 (Llanidloes By-pass) Order 1988 SI 1988/96
Sex Discrimination Act 1986 (Commencement No. 2) Order 1988 SI 1988/99

101-200
A4 Trunk Road (Bath Road, Hounslow) (Prescribed Routes) Order 1988 SI 1988/103
A3 Trunk Road (Wandsworth Common North Side, Wandsworth) (Box Junction) Order 1988 SI 1988/104
A41 Trunk Road (Watford Way, Barnet) (Prescribed Routes) Order 1988 SI 1988/105
Diplomatic and Consular Premises Act 1987 (Commencement No. 3) Order 1988 SI 1988/106
Education (Publication and Consultation Etc.) (Scotland) Amendment Regulations 1988 SI 1988/107
Amusements with Prizes (Variation of Fees) (Scotland) Order 1988 SI 1988/108
Gaming Act (Variation of Fees) (Scotland) Order 1988 SI 1988/109
Act of Adjournal (Consolidation) 1988 SI 1988/110
 The Harrogate (Parishes) Order 1988 S.I. 1988/111
 The Northavon (Parishes) Order 1988 S.I. 1988/112
 The Canterbury (Parish of Chestfield) Order 1988 S.I. 1988/113
Revaluation Rate Rebates (Scotland) Order 1987 SI 1988/114
AIDS (Control) (Contents of Reports) Order 1988 SI 1988/117
Capacity Serving Measures (Intoxicating Liquor) Regulations 1988 SI 1988/120
East of Birmingham/Birkenhead Trunk Road (A41 Improvement at Chester and Slip Roads) Order 1988 SI 1988/121
M53 Motorway (Southern Terminal Roundabout Section) Scheme 1988 SI 1988/122
Housing Revenue Account Rate Fund Contribution Limits (Scotland) Order 1988 SI 1988/123
Measuring Equipment (Liquid Fuel and Lubricants) Regulations 1988 SI 1988/128
 The Stafford (Parishes) Order 1988 S.I. 1988/129
 The Stratford-on-Avon (Parishes) Order 1988 S.I. 1988/130
Swansea-Manchester Trunk Road (A483) and the Shrewsbury-Dolgellau Trunk Road (A458) (Welshpool North-South Relief Road) Order 1988 SI 1988/131
Milk Marketing Scheme (Amendment) Regulations 1988 SI 1988/132
Commission for Local Authority Accounts in Scotland Regulations 1988 SI 1988/133
Wireless Telegraphy (Licence Charges) (Amendment) Regulations 1988 SI 1988/135
Third Country Fishing (Enforcement) Order 1988 SI 1988/136
Personal Pension Schemes (Appropriate Schemes) Regulations 1988 SI 1988/137
London Regional Transport (Levy) Order 1988 SI 1988/138
Town and Country Planning (Unitary Development Plans) Regulations 1988 SI 1988/139
Unitary Development Plans (West Midlands) (Appointed Day) Order 1988 SI 1988/140
A45 Felixstowe-Weedon Trunk Road (Kirton Road Roundabout Trimley St Martin) Detrunking Order 1988 SI 1988/141
(A167) London—Edinburgh—Thurso Trunk Road (Former Darlington County Borough Boundary to Coatham Mundeville (Aycliffe) Interchange De-Trunking) Order 1988 SI 1988/146
Ports (Finance) Act 1985 (Increase of Grants Limit) Order 1988 SI 1988/152
Foreign Compensation Commission (People's Republic of China) Rules Approval Instrument 1988 SI 1988/153
 The Babergh (Parishes) Order 1988 S.I. 1988/154
 The Bradford (Parishes) Order 1988 S.I. 1988/155
 The Wrekin (Parishes) Order 1988 S.I. 1988/156
Community Charges (Registration) (Scotland) Regulations 1988 SI 1988/157
United Kingdom Central Council for Nursing, Midwifery and Health Visiting (Electoral Scheme) (Variation) Order 1988 SI 1988/158
Gas (Register) Order 1988 SI 1988/159
Local Government (Direct Labour Organisations) (Competition) (Amendment) Regulations 1988 SI 1988/160
Prosecution of Offences (Custody Time Limits) (Amendment) Regulations 1988 SI 1988/164
Registration of Births, Deaths and Marriages (Fees) Order 1988 SI 1988/165
London Traffic Control System (Transfer) Order 1988 SI 1988/166
Merseyside Traffic Control System (Transfer) Order 1988 SI 1988/167
Environmentally Sensitive Areas Designation (Wales) (Amendment) Order 1988 SI 1988/173
Environmentally Sensitive Areas Designation (England) (Amendment) Order 1988 SI 1988/174
Environmentally Sensitive Areas (The Broads) Designation (Amendment) Order 1988 SI 1988/175
Environmentally Sensitive Areas (Somerset Levels and Moors) Designation (Amendment) Order 1988 SI 1988/176
Local Government Act 1985 (Police and Fire and Civil Defence Authorities) Precepts Limitation Order 1988 SI 1988/178
Finance Act 1987 (Commencement No. 1) Order 1988 SI 1988/179
 The South Herefordshire (Parishes) Order 1988 S.I. 1988/180
 The Wycombe (Parishes) Order 1988 S.I. 1988/181
Scottish Milk Marketing Schemes (Amendment) Regulations 1988 SI 1988/182
Customs Duties (ECSC) (Quota and Other Reliefs) (Amendment) Order 1988 SI 1988/185
Measuring Instruments (EEC Requirements) Regulations 1988 SI 1988/186
Commissioner for Local Administration in Scotland (Expenses) Regulations 1988 SI 1988/187
Merchant Shipping (Passenger Boarding Cards) Regulations 1988 SI 1988/191
Precept Limitation (Prescribed Maximum) (Greater Manchester Passenger Transport Authority) Order 1988 SI 1988/192
Precept Limitation (Prescribed Maximum) (Merseyside Passenger Transport Authority) Order 1988 SI 1988/193
Precept Limitation (Prescribed Maximum) (West Yorkshire Passenger Transport Authority) Order 1988 SI 1988/194
Diseases of Fish (Definition of Infected) Order 1988 SI 1988/195
County Council of the Royal County of Berkshire A329(M) Relief Road Special Road Variation Scheme 1987 Confirmation Instrument 1988 SI 1988/196
Severn-Trent Water Authority (Woodfarm Camp Main) Order 1988 SI 1988/197
Anatomy (Amendment) Regulations 1988 SI 1988/198
Precept Limitation (Prescribed Maximum) (Inner London Education Authority) Order 1988 SI 1988/199

201-300
West of Southampton—Bath Trunk Road A36 (Codford Bypass) Order 1988 SI 1988/204
West of Southampton—Bath Trunk Road A36 (Codford Bypass) (Detrunking) Order 1988 SI 1988/205
Cycle Racing on Highways (Amendment) Regulations 1988 SI 1988/215
Pensions Increase (Review) Order 1988 SI 1988/217
Fife and Tayside Regions and North East Fife and Perth and Kinross Districts (Duncrievie) Boundaries Amendment Order 1988 SI 1988/218 (S. 22)
East Kilbride and City of Glasgow Districts (Carmunnock) Boundaries Amendment Order 1988 SI 1988/219 (S. 23)
Strathclyde and Central Regions and Monklands and Falkirk Districts (Black Loch) Boundaries Amendment Order 1988 SI 1988/220 (S. 24)
City of Glasgow and Strathkelvin Districts (Easter Balmuildy Farm and Laigh Kenmure Farm) Boundaries Amendment Order 1988 SI 1988/221 (S. 25)
Central Regional Council (Kirkton Burn, Balquhidder) Water Order 1988 SI 1988/222
Superannuation (Children's Pensions) (Earnings Limit) Order 1988 SI 1988/223
Diseases of Animals (Approved Disinfectants) (Amendment) Order 1988 SI 1988/224
Severn-Trent Water Authority (Hartlebury Borehole) Order 1988 SI 1988/225
Matrimonial Causes (Amendment) Rules 1988 SI 1988/226
Stock Transfer (Specified Securities) Order 1988 SI 1988/231
Stock Transfer (Gilt-edged Securities) (Exempt Transfer) Regulations 1988 SI 1988/232
London Government Reorganisation (Transfer of Loans) Order 1988 SI 1988/233
National Assistance (Charges for Accommodation) Regulations 1988 SI 1988/234
River Tweed (Baits and Lures) Regulations 1988 SI 1988/235
Industrial Training Levy (Plastics Processing) Order 1988 SI 1988/236
Severn-Trent Water Authority (Abolition of the Sinfin Moor Drainage District) Order 1987 SI 1988/237
Agricultural Levy Reliefs (Frozen Beef and Veal) Order 1988 SI 1988/238
Family Credit (Transitional) Amendment Regulations 1988 SI 1988/239
Education (Grants) (Royal Ballet School) Regulations 1988 SI 1988/240
Northamptonshire and Oxfordshire (County Boundaries) Order 1988 SI 1988/241
Local Government Administration (Matters Subject to Investigation) Order 1988 SI 1988/242
Carriage by Air (Parties to Convention) Order 1988 SI 1988/243
Foreign Compensation (Financial Provisions) Order 1988 SI 1988/244
International Trust Fund for Tuvalu (Immunities and Privileges) Order 1988 SI 1988/245
Merchant Shipping Act 1970 (Cayman Islands) Order 1988 SI 1988/246
Turks and Caicos Islands Constitution Order 1988 SI 1988/247
Naval, Military and Air Forces etc. (Disablement and Death) Service Pensions Amendment Order 1988 SI 1988/248
Sex Discrimination (Amendment) Order 1988 SI 1988/249
Copyright (International Conventions) (Amendment) Order 1988 SI 1988/250
Air Navigation (Third Amendment) Order 1988 SI 1988/251
Merchant Shipping (Fishing Boats Registry) (Amendment) Order 1988 SI 1988/252
Imperial War Museum (Board of Trustees) Order 1988 SI 1988/253
Chester-Bangor Trunk Road (A55) (Travellers' Inn Improvement) Order 1988 SI 1988/254
Combined Probation Areas (Northumbria) Order 1988 SI 1988/258
Hereford and Worcester (District Boundaries) Order 1988 SI 1988/259
Police (Promotion) (Scotland) Amendment Regulations 1988 SI 1988/260
Cwmbran Development Corporation (Transfer of Property and Dissolution) Order 1988 SI 1988/265
Capital Gains Tax (Definition of Unit Trust Scheme) Regulations 1988 SI 1988/266
Income Tax (Definition of Unit Trust Scheme) Regulations 1988 SI 1988/267
Stamp Duty and Stamp Duty Reserve Tax (Definitions of Unit Trust Scheme) Regulations 1988 SI 1988/268
Social Security (Benefit) (Members of the Forces) Amendment Regulations 1988 SI 1988/269
Home Purchase Assistance (Price-limits) Order 1988 SI 1988/270
Road Vehicles (Construction and Use) (Amendment) Regulations 1988 SI 1988/271
London-Carlisle-Glasgow-Inverness Trunk Road (A6) (Barton-Le-Clay Bypass and Slip Road) Order 1988 SI 1988/272
London-Carlisle-Glasgow-Inverness Trunk Road (Barton-in-the-Clay Diversion) (Revocation) Order 1988 SI 1988/273
Prevention of Terrorism (Temporary Provisions) Act 1984 (Continuance) Order 1988 SI 1988/274
Industrial Training Levy (Engineering Board) Order 1988 SI 1988/275
Employment Protection (Variation of Limits) Order 1988 SI 1988/276
Unfair Dismissal (Increase of Limits of Basic and Special Awards) Order 1988 SI 1988/277
County Court (Amendment) Rules 1988 SI 1988/278
County Court (Forms) (Amendment) Rules 1988 SI 1988/279
Authorised Unit Trust Scheme (Pricing of Units and Dealings by Trustee and Manager) Regulations 1988 SI 1988/280
Agriculture (Maintenance, Repair and Insurance of Fixed Equipment) (Amendment) Regulations 1988 SI 1988/281
Agriculture (Time-Limit) Regulations 1988 SI 1988/282
Housing and Planning Act 1986 (Commencement No. 11) Order 1988 SI 1988/283
Authorised Unit Trust Scheme (Investment and Borrowing Powers) Regulations 1988 SI 1988/284
Welsh Water Authority (Ashgrove Treatment Works and Heronbridge to Sealand Pipeline and Associated Pipelines) Order 1988 SI 1988/285
Rate Limitation (Prescribed Maximum) (Rates) Order 1988 SI 1988/286
Protection of Wrecks (Designation No. 1 Order 1986) (Amendment) Order 1988 SI 1988/287
Wildlife and Countryside Act 1981 (Variation of Schedules) Order 1988 SI 1988/288
A406 London North Circular Trunk Road (Hanger Lane to Harrow Road Improvement, Trunk Road and Slip Roads) Order 1988 SI 1988/290
 The Vale Royal (Parishes) Order 1988 S.I. 1988/291
 The Staffordshire Moorlands (Parishes) Order 1988 S.I. 1988/292
 The North Shropshire (Parishes) Order 1988 S.I. 1988/293
Residential Care Order (Secure Accommodation) (Scotland) Regulations 1988 SI 1988/294
Control of Borrowing (Amendment) Order 1988 SI 1988/295
Measuring Instruments (EEC Requirements) (Gas Volume Meters) Regulations 1988 SI 1988/296
Pilotage Commission Provision of Funds Scheme 1988 (Confirmation) Order 1988 SI 1988/297
Rules of the Supreme Court (Amendment) 1988 SI 1988/298
Social Security (Contributions) Amendment Regulations 1988 SI 1988/299
Exeter-Launceston-Bodmin Trunk Road A30 (Launceston to Plusha) (Detrunking) Order 1988 SI 1988/300

301-400
Certification Officer (Amendment of Fees) Regulations 1988 SI 1988/310
Misuse of Drugs (Licence Fees) (Amendment) Regulations 1988 SI 1988/311
Northamptonshire and Warwickshire (County Boundaries) Order 1988 SI 1988/314
West Midlands (District Boundaries) Order 1988 SI 1988/315
Financial Services Act 1986 (Investment Advertisements) (Exemptions) Order 1988 SI 1988/316
Merchant Shipping (Closing of Openings in Enclosed Superstructures and in Bulkheads above the Bulkhead Deck) Regulations 1988 SI 1988/317
Financial Services Act 1986 (Restriction of Scope of Act) Order 1988 SI 1988/318
Assisted Areas (Amendment) Order 1988 SI 1988/322
London Government Reorganisation (Non-Domestic Mortgages) Order 1988 SI 1988/323
Horsey Estate (Area of Special Protection) Order 1988 SI 1988/324
 The St. Edmundsbury (Parishes) Order 1988 S.I. 1988/325
 The Newark and Sherwood (Parishes) Order 1988 S.I. 1988/326
Water Byelaws (Extension) (Scotland) Order 1988 SI 1988/327
Jordanhill School Grant Regulations 1988 SI 1988/328
Magistrates' Courts (Family Law Act 1986) Rules 1988 SI 1988/329
Merchant Shipping (Light Dues) (Amendment) Regulations 1988 SI 1988/330
National Assistance (Charges for Accommodation) (Scotland) Regulations 1988 SI 1988/331
Local Authorities (Publicity Account) (Exemption) (Scotland) Order 1988 SI 1988/332
Bingo Duty Regulations 1988 SI 1988/333
Gaming Act (Variation of Fees) (No. 2) Order 1988 SI 1988/334
Lotteries (Gaming Board Fees) Order 1988 SI 1988/335
Sugar Beet (Research and Education) Order 1988 SI 1988/336
Valuation Timetable (Scotland) Amendment Order 1988 SI 1988/337
Goods Vehicles (Plating and Testing) (Amendment) Regulations 1988 SI 1988/338
Motor Vehicles (Tests) (Amendment) Regulations 1988 SI 1988/339
Public Service Vehicles (Conditions of Fitness, Equipment, Use and Certification) (Amendment) Regulations 1988 SI 1988/340
Tayside, Fife and Central Regions and Perth and Kinross, Dunfermline and Clackmannan Districts (Solsgirth) Boundaries Amendment Order 1988 SI 1988/347 (S. 34)
Ross and Cromarty and Inverness Districts (Monar Lodge) Boundaries Amendment Order 1988 SI 1988/348 (S. 35)
Tayside and Grampian Regions and Angus and Kincardine and Deeside Districts (River North Esk) Boundaries Amendment Order 1988 SI 1988/349 (S. 36)
Financial Services Act 1986 (Miscellaneous Exemptions) Order 1988 SI 1988/350
Financial Services Tribunal (Conduct of Investigations) Rules 1988 SI 1988/351
Insurance (Fees) Regulations 1988 SI 1988/352
Education (Training Grants) (Amendment) Regulations 1988 SI 1988/355
Plant Breeders' Rights (Fees) (Amendment) Regulations 1988 SI 1988/356
Seeds (National Lists of Varieties) (Fees) (Amendment) Regulations 1988 SI 1988/357
Local Government (Allowances) (Amendment) Regulations 1988 SI 1988/358
Local Government Reorganisation (Capital Money) (Greater London) Order 1988 SI 1988/359
Capital Gains Tax (Gilt-edged Securities) Order 1988 SI 1988/360
Construction Plant and Equipment (Harmonisation of Noise Emission Standards) Regulations 1988 SI 1988/361
Falling-object Protective Structures for Construction Plant (EEC Requirements) Regulations 1988 SI 1988/362
Roll-over Protective Structures for Construction Plant (EEC Requirements) Regulations 1988 SI 1988/363
National Health Service (Charges for Drugs and Appliances) (Scotland) Amendment Regulations 1988 SI 1988/365
County of Mid Glamorgan (Electoral Arrangements) Order 1988 SI 1988/366
Personal Injuries (Civilians) Amendment Scheme 1988 SI 1988/367
International Carriage of Dangerous Goods by Road (Fees) Regulations 1988 SI 1988/370
International Transport of Goods under Cover of TIR Carnets (Fees) Regulations 1988 SI 1988/371
Local Authorities (Allowances) (Scotland) Amendment Regulations 1988 SI 1988/372
Gaming Act (Variation of Fees) (Scotland) (No.2) Order 1988 SI 1988/373
Upper Spey and Associated Waters Protection (Renewal) Order 1988 SI 1988/374
Family Law Act 1986 (Commencement No.1) Order 1988 SI 1988/375
Wireless Telegraphy (Broadcast Licence Charges and Exemption) (Amendment) Regulations 1988 SI 1988/376
Teachers' Superannuation (Miscellaneous Provisions) Regulations 1988 SI 1988/387
Civil Aviation (Navigation Services Charges) (Third Amendment) Regulations 1988 SI 1988/388
Salmon (Weekly Close Time) (Scotland) Regulations 1988 SI 1988/390
Registered Housing Associations (Accounting Requirements) Order 1988 SI 1988/395
Feeding Stuffs Regulations 1988 SI 1988/396
Criminal Justice Act 1987 (Commencement No. 2) Order 1988 SI 1988/397

401-500
National Health Service (Constitution of District Health Authority) Order 1988 SI 1988/406
National Health Service (Determination of Districts) Amendment Order 1988 SI 1988/407
Public Service Vehicles (London Local Service Licences) (Amendment) Regulations 1988 SI 1988/408
London — Portsmouth Trunk Road A3 (Liphook — Ham Barn Section) (Part 1) Order 1988 SI 1988/409
London-Portsmouth Trunk Road A3 (Liphook-Ham Barn Section Slip Roads) (Part 1) Order 1988 SI 1988/410
Aycliffe and Peterlee Development Corporation (Transfer of Property and Dissolution) Order 1988 SI 1988/412
Washington Development Corporation (Transfer of Property and Dissolution) Order 1988 SI 1988/413
Employment Protection (Recoupment of Unemployment Benefit and Supplementary Benefit) (Amendment) Regulations 1988 SI 1988/419
Civil Legal Aid (Scotland) (Fees) Amendment Regulations 1988 SI 1988/420
Criminal Legal Aid (Scotland) (Fees) Amendment Regulations 1988 SI 1988/421
Legal Aid (Scotland) (Fees in Civil Proceedings) Amendment Regulations 1988 SI 1988/422
Legal Aid in Criminal Proceedings (Costs) Regulations 1988 SI 1988/423
Family Law Reform Act 1987 (Commencement No. 1) Order 1988 SI 1988/425
Northern Ireland (Emergency Provisions) Acts 1978 and 1987 (Continuance) Order 1988 SI 1988/426
National Health Service (Charges for Drugs and Appliances) Amendment Regulations 1988 SI 1988/427
National Health Service (Payments for Optical Appliances) Amendment Regulations 1988 SI 1988/428
Social Security (Earnings Factor) Amendment Regulations 1988 SI 1988/429
Statutory Maternity Pay (Compensation of Employers) Amendment Regulations 1988 SI 1988/430
Statutory Sick Pay (Additional Compensation of Employers) Amendment Regulations 1988 SI 1988/431
Local Government (Prescribed Expenditure) (Amendment) Regulations 1988 SI 1988/434
Social Security Benefit (Persons Abroad) Amendment Regulations 1988 SI 1988/435
Social Security Benefits Up-rating Regulations 1988 SI 1988/436
Education (Grants for Training of Teachers and Community Education Workers) (Scotland) SI 1988/437
Financial Services (Designated Countries and Territories) (Overseas Insurance Companies) Order 1988 SI 1988/439
Legal Advice and Assistance at Police Stations (Remuneration) Regulations 1988 SI 1988/446
Legal Advice and Representation (Duty Solicitor) (Remuneration) (Amendment) Regulations 1988 SI 1988/447
Building Societies (General Charge and Fees) Regulations 1988 SI 1988/448
Friendly Societies (Fees) Regulations 1988 SI 1988/449
Industrial and Provident Societies (Amendment of Fees) Regulations 1988 SI 1988/450
Industrial and Provident Societies (Credit Unions) (Amendment of Fees) Regulations 1988 SI 1988/451
Local Government Reorganisation (Debt Administration) (Merseyside) Order 1988 SI 1988/452
Industrial Assurance (Fees) Regulations 1988 SI 1988/453
Gipsy Encampments (District of Shepway) Order 1988 SI 1988/454
Coal Industry (Limit on Deficit Grants) Order 1988 SI 1988/455
Coal Industry (Restructuring Grants) Order 1988 SI 1988/456
Meters (Certification) (Fees) Regulations 1988 SI 1988/457
Housing Benefit (Transitional) Amendment Regulations 1988 SI 1988/458
Legal Advice and Assistance (Financial Conditions) (No. 2) Regulations 1988 SI 1988/459
Legal Aid (General) (Amendment) Regulations 1988 SI 1988/460
Legal Advice and Assistance (Amendment) Regulations 1988 SI 1988/461
National Health Service (Charges to Overseas Visitors) (Scotland) Amendment (No.2) Regulations 1988 SI 1988/462
National Health Service (Payments for Optical Appliances) (Scotland) Amendment Regulations 1988 SI 1988/463
National Health Service (Dental Charges) (Scotland) Regulations 1988 SI 1988/464
Local Government (Superannuation and Compensation) (Amendment) Regulations 1988 SI 1988/466
Legal Aid (Assessment of Resources) (Amendment) Regulations 1988 SI 1988/467
Legal Aid in Criminal Proceedings (General) (Amendment) Regulations 1988 SI 1988/468
Housing Benefit (Permitted Totals) Order 1988 SI 1988/471
National Health Service (Charges to Overseas Visitors) Amendment (No. 2) Regulations 1988 SI 1988/472
National Health Service (Dental Charges) Regulations 1988 SI 1988/473
Personal and Occupational Pension Schemes (Tax Approval and Miscellaneous Provisions) Regulations 1988 SI 1988/474
Contracting-out (Miscellaneous Amendments) Regulations 1988 SI 1988/475
Occupational Pension Schemes (Miscellaneous Amendments) Regulations 1988 SI 1988/476
Education (Mandatory Awards) (Amendment) Regulations 1988 SI 1988/477
Merchant Shipping (Fees) (Amendment) Regulations 1988 SI 1988/478
Merchant Shipping (Maintenance of Seamen's Dependants) (Amendment) Regulations 1988 SI 1988/479
Landlord and Tenant Act 1987 (Commencement No. 2) Order 1988 SI 1988/480
Scottish Islands Agricultural Development Programme Regulations 1988 SI 1988/481
Criminal Justice (Scotland) Act 1987 (Commencement No.5) Order 1988 SI 1988/482
Criminal Justice (Scotland) Act 1987 (Commencement No. 4) Order 1988 SI 1988/483
Rent Assessment Committee (England and Wales) (Leasehold Valuation Tribunal) (Amendment) Regulations 1988 SI 1988/484
Fire Safety and Safety of Places of Sport Act 1987 (Commencement No. 2) Order 1988 SI 1988/485
National Health Service (General Ophthalmic Services) Amendment Regulations 1988 SI 1988/486
Unemployment Benefit (Disqualification Period) Order 1988 SI 1988/487
County Court (Records of Proceedings) (Amendment) Regulations 1988 SI 1988/488
Advice and Assistance (Scotland) Amendment Regulations 1988 SI 1988/489
Civil Legal Aid (Scotland) Amendment SI 1988/490
Environmentally Sensitive Areas (Breadalbane) Designation (Amendment) Order 1988 SI 1988/491
Environmentally Sensitive Areas (Loch Lomond) Designation (Amendment) Order 1988 SI 1988/492
Environmentally Sensitive Areas (Stewartry) Designation Order 1988 SI 1988/493
Environmentally Sensitive Areas (Whitlaw and Eildon) Designation Order 1988 SI 1988/494
Environmentally Sensitive Areas (Machair of the Uists and Benbecula, Barra and Vatersay) Designation Order 1988 SI 1988/495
Financial Services Act 1986 (Extension of Scope of Act and Meaning of Collective Investment Scheme) Order 1988 SI 1988/496

501-600

 The Milton Keynes (Parishes) Order 1988 S.I. 1988/501
Banking Act 1987 (Commencement No. 3) Order 1988 SI 1988/502
Income Tax (Indexation) Order 1988 SI 1988/503
Occupational Pension Schemes (Rate of Tax under Paragraph 2(2) of Part II of Schedule 5 to the Finance Act 1970) Order 1988 SI 1988/504
Inheritance Tax (Indexation) Order 1988 SI 1988/505
Capital Gains Tax (Annual Exempt Amount) Order 1988 SI 1988/506
Value Added Tax (Confectionery) Order 1988 SI 1988/507
Value Added Tax (Increase of Registration Limits) Order 1988 SI 1988/508
County Court Fees (Amendment) Order 1988 SI 1988/509
Supreme Court Fees (Amendment) Order 1988 SI 1988/510
 The Tonbridge and Malling (Parishes) Order 1988 S.I. 1988/515
Social Security (Credits) Amendment Regulations 1988 SI 1988/516
Social Security Act 1988 (Commencement No. 1) Order 1988 SI 1988/520
Income Support (Transitional) Amendment Regulations 1988 SI 1988/521
Social Security (Claims and Payments) Amendment Regulations 1988 SI 1988/522
Occupational Pension Schemes (Transfer Values) Amendment Regulations 1988 SI 1988/523
Social Fund (Applications) Regulations 1988 SI 1988/524
Veterinary Surgeons Act 1966 (Schedule 3 Amendment) Order 1988 SI 1988/526
Social Security (Financial Adjustments) Order 1988 SI 1988/529
Social Security (Attendance Allowance) Amendment Regulations 1988 SI 1988/531
Statutory Maternity Pay (General) Amendment Regulations 1988 SI 1988/532
Free Zone (Liverpool) Designation (Variation) Order 1988 SI 1988/533
Dairy Produce Quotas (Amendment) Regulations 1988 SI 1988/534
National Health Service (Supply of Goods at Clinics etc.) (Scotland) Amendment Regulations 1988 SI 1988/535
Welfare Food Regulations 1988 SI 1988/536
Prison (Scotland) Amendment Rules 1988 SI 1988/537
European Communities (Iron and Steel Employees Re-adaptation Benefits Scheme) (No. 2) Regulations 1988 SI 1988/538
Education (Teachers) (Amendment) Regulations 1988 SI 1988/542
National Health Service (General Ophthalmic Services) (Scotland) Amendment Regulations 1988 SI 1988/543
Social Security (Industrial Injuries) (Dependency Payments) Regulations 1988 SI 1988/544
National Health Service (Payments for Optical Appliances) (Scotland) Amendment (No. 2) Regulations 1988 SI 1988/545
National Health Service (Travelling Expenses and Remission of Charges) (Scotland) Regulations 1988 SI 1988/546
Housing Support Grant (Scotland) Order 1988 SI 1988/547
Housing Support Grant (Scotland) Variation Order 1988 SI 1988/548
Anglian Water Authority (Does Corner Boreholes) Order 1988 SI 1988/549
National Health Service (Travelling Expenses and Remission of Charges) Regulations 1988 SI 1988/551
National Health Service (Payments for Optical Appliances) Amendment (No. 2) Regulations 1988 SI 1988/552
Social Security (Industrial Injuries) (Miscellaneous Amendments) Regulations 1988 SI 1988/553
Social Security Benefit (Dependency) Amendment Regulations 1988 SI 1988/554
Welfare Food Amendment Regulations 1988 SI 1988/555
Social Security Benefit (Dependency) Amendment (No. 2) Regulations 1988 SI 1988/556
European Parliamentary Election Petition (Amendment) Rules 1988 SI 1988/557
Weights and Measures (Northern Ireland) Order 1988 SI 1988/558
Crofting Counties Agricultural Grants (Scotland) Scheme 1988 SI 1988/559
A13 Trunk Road (East India Dock Road, Tower Hamlets) (Prescribed Routes) Order 1988 SI 1988/560
Thames Water Authority (East Woodhay Boreholes) Order 1988 SI 1988/561
Anglian Water Authority (Welton Borehole) Water Order 1988 SI 1988/562
North Wales Police (Amalgamation) (Amendment) Order 1988 SI 1988/564
Local Government Act 1985 (Severn-Trent Water Authority Regional Land Drainage Committee) (Revocation) Order 1988 SI 1988/565
Severn-Trent Water Authority (Regional Land Drainage Committee) Order 1988 SI 1988/566
Social Security Act 1986 (Commencement No. 9) Order 1988 SI 1988/567
War Pensions (Chinese Seamen and Indian Seamen) (Revocations) Order 1988 SI 1988/568
Protection of Trading Interests (Australian Trade Practices) Order 1988 SI 1988/569
(A18) Sheffield—Grimsby Trunk Road (Barnetby Top to Grimsby) (Detrunking) Order 1988 SI 1988/570
Public Trustee (Fees) (Amendment) Order 1988 SI 1988/571
Workmen's Compensation (Supplementation) Amendment Scheme 1988 SI 1988/574
Petty Sessional Divisions (Suffolk) Order 1988 SI 1988/575
National Health Service (General Dental Services) Amendment Regulations 1988 SI 1988/576
A19 Trunk Road (York Outer Ring Road to Clifton) (Detrunking) Order 1988 SI 1988/578
A604 Catthorpe — Harwich Trunk Road (Kettering to Thrapston Section and Slip Roads) Supplementary Order 1988 SI 1988/581
Parliamentary Commissioner Order 1988 SI 1988/585
Antarctic Treaty (Agreed Measures) Order 1988 SI 1988/586
Antarctic Treaty (Specially Protected Areas) Order 1988 SI 1988/587
Child Abduction and Custody (Parties to Conventions) (Amendment) Order 1988 SI 1988/588
Health Service Commissioner for England (Health Education Authority) Order 1988 SI 1988/589
Social Security (Sweden) Order 1988 SI 1988/590
Social Security (Reciprocal Agreements) Order 1988 SI 1988/591
Appropriation (Northern Ireland) Order 1988 SI 1988/592
Drug Trafficking Offences (Enforcement in England and Wales) Order 1988 SI 1988/593
Social Security (Northern Ireland) Order 1988 SI 1988/594
Statistics of Trade and Employment (Northern Ireland) Order 1988 SI 1988/595
Registration of Title Order 1988 SI 1988/596
Health Service Commissioner for Wales (Welsh Health Promotion Authority) Order 1988 SI 1988/597

601-700
Dutch Elm Disease (Local Authorities) (Amendment) Order 1988 SI 1988/604
Dutch Elm Disease (Restriction on Movement of Elms) (Amendment) Order 1988 SI 1988/605
County Council of Isle of Wight New Yar Bridge Scheme 1985 Confirmation Instrument 1988 SI 1988/606
(A435) Bath—Lincoln Trunk Road (Sedgeberrow Bypass) Order 1988 SI 1988/608
Public Lending Right (Increase of Limit) Order 1988 SI 1988/609
Combined Probation Areas (Suffolk) Order 1988 SI 1988/612
Act of Sederunt (Rules for the Registration of Custody Orders of the Sheriff Court) 1988 SI 1988/613
Act of Sederunt (Sheriff Court Ordinary Cause Rules Amendment No.1) (Family Law) 1988 SI 1988/614
Act of Sederunt (Rules of the Court of Session Amendment No.1) (Family Law) 1988 SI 1988/615
Social Security Pensions (Home Responsibilities and Miscellaneous Amendments) Amendment Regulations 1988 SI 1988/623
Injuries in War (Shore Employments) Compensation (Amendment) Scheme 1988 SI 1988/624
Local Government Superannuation (Scotland) Amendment Regulations 1988 SI 1988/625
Fire Safety and Safety of Places of Sport Act 1987 (Commencement No.3) (Scotland) Order 1988 SI 1988/626
Weights and Measures (Quantity Marking and Abbreviations of Units) (Amendment) Regulations 1988 SI 1988/627
Land Registration (Official Searches) Rules 1988 SI 1988/629
Building Societies (Designation of Prescribed Regulatory Authorities) Order 1988 SI 1988/630
Standard and Collective Community Charges (Scotland) Regulations 1988 SI 1988/631
Personal Community Charge (Students) (Scotland) Regulations 1988 SI 1988/632
Prior Rights of Surviving Spouse (Scotland) Order 1988 SI 1988/633
Submarine Pipe-lines (Designated Owners) Order 1988 SI 1988/634
Local Loans (Increase of Limit) Order 1988 SI 1988/635
Income Tax (Sub-Contractors in the Construction Industry) Regulations 1988 SI 1988/636
Income Tax (Employments) (No.17) Regulations 1988 SI 1988/637
Registration of Births and Deaths (Amendment) Regulations 1988 SI 1988/638
War Pensions (Mercantile Marine) (Amendment) Scheme 1988 SI 1988/639
Profit-Related Pay (Shortfall Recovery) Regulations 1988 SI 1988/640
Merchant Shipping (Passenger Boarding Cards) (Application to non-UK Ships) Regulations 1988 SI 1988/641
Merchant Shipping (Closing of Openings in Enclosed Superstructures and in Bulkheads above the Bulkhead Deck) (Application to Non-United Kingdom ships) Regulations 1988 SI 1988/642
Department of Transport (Fees) Order 1988 SI 1988/643
Banking Act 1987 (Commencement No. 4) Order 1988 SI 1988/644
Banking Act 1987 (Advertisements) Regulations 1988 SI 1988/645
Banking Act 1987 (Exempt Transactions) Regulations 1988 SI 1988/646
State Scheme Premiums (Actuarial Tables) Amendment Regulations 1988 SI 1988/647
(A1) London—Edinburgh—Thurso Trunk Road (Newcastle Western Bypass and Slip Roads) Order 1986 Variation Order 1988 SI 1988/652
Milk Quota (Calculation of Standard Quota) (Amendment) Order 1988 SI 1988/653
Finance Act 1986 (Stamp Duty and Stamp Duty Reserve Tax) (Amendment) Regulations 1988 SI 1988/654
A1 Trunk Road (Barnet Way, Barnet) (Box Junction) Order 1988 SI 1988/656
Personal Equity Plan (Amendment) Regulations 1988 SI 1988/657
A1 Trunk Road (Barnet Way, Barnet) (Prescribed Routes) Order 1988 SI 1988/658
Family Credit (General) Amendment Regulations 1988 SI 1988/660
Housing Benefit (General) Amendment Regulations 1988 SI 1988/661
Housing Benefit (Supply of Information) Regulations 1988 SI 1988/662
Income Support (General) Amendment Regulations 1988 SI 1988/663
Social Security (Payments on account, Overpayments and Recovery) Regulations 1988 SI 1988/664
Land Registration Fee Order 1988 SI 1988/665
Legal Advice and Assistance (Financial Conditions) Regulations 1988 SI 1988/666
Legal Aid (Financial Conditions) Regulations 1988 SI 1988/667
Pneumoconiosis etc. (Workers' Compensation) (Payment of Claims) Regulations 1988 SI 1988/668
Gipsy Encampments (Metropolitan Borough of Gateshead) Order 1988 SI 1988/669
Income Support (Transitional) Amendment No. 2 Regulations 1988 SI 1988/670
Seed Potatoes (Fees) (Scotland) Regulations 1988 SI 1988/671
Insurance Companies (Accounts and Statements) (Amendment) Regulations 1988 SI 1988/672
Insurance Companies (Amendment) Regulations 1988 SI 1988/673
Social Security (Contributions) Amendment (No. 2) Regulations 1988 SI 1988/674
Social Security (Contributions, Re-rating) Order 1988 SI 1988/675
Social Security (Treasury Supplement to and Allocation of Contributions) (Re-rating) Order 1988 SI 1988/676
Salmon and Freshwater Fisheries (Expenses) Regulations 1988 SI 1988/677
North West Water Authority (Knowsley Park Water Mains) Order 1988 SI 1988/680
Act of Sederunt (Fees of Solicitors in the Sheriff Court) 1988 SI 1988/681
Act of Sederunt (Exchequer Causes) 1988 SI 1988/682
Cod (Specified Sea Areas) (Prohibition of Fishing) Order 1988 SI 1988/683
Act of Sederunt (Rules of the Court of Session Amendment No.2) (Solicitors' Fees) 1988 SI 1988/684
Advice and Assistance (Financial Conditions) (Scotland) Regulations 1988 SI 1988/685
Civil Legal Aid (Financial Conditions) (Scotland) Regulations 1988 SI 1988/686
Registration of Births and Deaths (Welsh Language) (Amendment) Regulations 1988 SI 1988/687
Social Security (Payments on account, Overpayments and Recovery) Amendment Regulations 1988 SI 1988/688
Social Security (Unemployment, Sickness and Invalidity Benefit) Amendment Regulations 1988 SI 1988/689

701-800
Medicines (Hormone Growth Promoters) (Prohibition of Use) Regulations 1988 SI 1988/705
Public Companies (Disclosure of Interests in Shares) (Investment Management Exclusion) Regulations 1988 SI 1988/706
Consumer Credit (Exempt Agreements) (No. 2) (Amendment) Order 1988 SI 1988/707
Free Zone (Amendment) Regulations 1988 SI 1988/710
Asbestos (Prohibitions) (Amendment) Regulations 1988 SI 1988/711
Health and Safety (Fees) Regulations 1988 SI 1988/712
Local Government Reorganisation (Property) (Greater Manchester) Order 1988 SI 1988/713
Milk Quota (Calculation of Standard Quota) (Scotland) Amendment Order 1988 SI 1988/714
Multilateral Investment Guarantee Agency Act 1988 (Commencement) Order 1988 SI 1988/715
Financial Services Act 1986 (Investment Advertisements) (Exemptions) (No. 2) Order 1988 SI 1988/716
Financial Services Act 1986 (Stabilisation) Order 1988 SI 1988/717
Financial Services Act 1986 (Miscellaneous Exemptions) (No.2) Order 1988 SI 1988/723
Financial Services Act 1986 (Occupational Pension Schemes) (No.2) Order 1988 SI 1988/724
Kinneil and Manuel Light Railway Order 1988 SI 1988/725
Town and Country Planning (Compensation for Restrictions on Mineral Working) (Amendment) Regulations 1988 SI 1988/726
Police (Amendment) Regulations 1988 SI 1988/727
Police Cadets (Amendment) Regulations 1988 SI 1988/728
Rate Limitation (Designation of Authorities) (Exemption) Order 1988 SI 1988/729
A13 Trunk Road (Newham, Barking and Dagenham, and Havering) (Speed Limits) Order 1988 SI 1988/730
Parsley (Temporary Prohibition on Landing) (Great Britain) Order 1988 SI 1988/736
A406 Trunk Road (South Woodford to Barking Relief Road, Redbridge, Newham, Barking and Dagenham) (Speed Limits) Order 1988 SI 1988/737
Financial Services Act 1986 (Delegation) (No. 2) Order 1988 SI 1988/738
Financial Services Act 1986 (Commencement) (No. 8) Order 1988 SI 1988/740
Submarine Pipe-lines (Designated Owners) (No. 2) Order 1988 SI 1988/741
PARLIAMENT  SI 1988/742
Commissioners for Oaths (Fees) Order 1988 SI 1988/743
Finance (No. 2) Act 1987 (Commencement) Order 1988 SI 1988/744
Income and Corporation Taxes Act 1988 (Appointed Day) Order 1988 SI 1988/745
Clydebank and City of Glasgow Districts (Yoker) Boundaries Amendment Order 1988 SI 1988/746 (S. 81)
Prison (Amendment) (No. 2) Rules 1988 SI 1988/747
International Development Association (Eighth Replenishment) Order 1988 SI 1988/750
Local Government Reorganisation (Property) (West Yorkshire) Order 1988 SI 1988/751
Income Tax (Interest on Unpaid Tax and Repayment Supplement) Order 1988 SI 1988/756
Income Tax (Official Rate of Interest on Beneficial Loans) Order 1988 SI 1988/757
Stamp Duty Reserve Tax (Interest on Tax Repaid) Order 1988 SI 1988/758
Community Drivers' Hours and Recording Equipment (Exemptions and Supplementary Provisions) (Amendment) Regulations 1988 SI 1988/760
A405 North Orbital Road (Long Lane Roundabout — A412) and Connecting Roads Detrunking Order 1988 SI 1988/761
Chester-Bangor Trunk Road (Conwy Morfa to Llanfairfechan, Pen-y-Clip Section) Order 1988 SI 1988/762
Cubic Measures (Ballast and Agricultural Materials) (Amendment) Regulations 1988 SI 1988/765
Classification, Packaging and Labelling of Dangerous Substances (Amendment) Regulations 1988 SI 1988/766
A6 Trunk Road (The Leicester City Boundary to the Southern District Distributor Road) Detrunking Order 1988 SI 1988/771
Civil Aviation (Canadian Navigation Services) (Amendment) Regulations 1988 SI 1988/772
(A49) Shrewsbury to Whitchurch to Warrington Trunk Road (Improvement at Holloway Mouth) Order 1988 SI 1988/775
Building Societies (Supplementary Capital) Order 1988 SI 1988/777
Ionising Radiation (Protection of Persons Undergoing Medical Examination or Treatment) Regulations 1988 SI 1988/778
Finance Act 1987 (Commencement No.2) Order 1988 SI 1988/780
Income Tax (Interest Relief) (Qualifying Lenders) Order 1988 SI 1988/781
Local Government Reorganisation (Property) (West Midlands) Order 1988 SI 1988/783
Veterinary Surgeons (Agreement with the Republic of Ireland) Order 1988 SI 1988/784
European Communities (Designation) Order 1988 SI 1988/785
Antarctic Treaty (Contracting Parties) Order 1988 SI 1988/786
Merchant Shipping (Confirmation of Legislation) (Gibraltar) Order 1988 SI 1988/787
Merchant Shipping (Prevention of Oil Pollution) (Bermuda) Order 1988 SI 1988/788
Merchant Shipping Act 1974 (Cayman Islands) Order 1988 SI 1988/789
Merchant Shipping Act 1979 (Cayman Islands) Order 1988 SI 1988/790
Multilateral Investment Guarantee Agency (Overseas Territories) Order 1988 SI 1988/791
Treaty on the Elimination of Intermediate-Range and Shorter-Range Missiles (Inspections) (Privileges and Immunities) Order 1988 SI 1988/792
Criminal Injuries (Compensation) (Northern Ireland) Order 1988 SI 1988/793
Crossbows (Northern Ireland) Order 1988 SI 1988/794
General Assistance Grants (Abolition) (Northern Ireland) Order 1988 SI 1988/795
Wages (Northern Ireland) Order 1988 SI 1988/796
Copyright (Sound Recordings) (Indonesia) Order 1988 SI 1988/797
High Court of Justiciary Fees Amendment Order 1988 SI 1988/798
Court of Session etc. Fees Amendment Order 1988 SI 1988/799

801-900
Cosmetic Products (Safety) (Amendment) Regulations 1988 SI 1988/802
Financial Services Act 1986 (Restriction of Scope of Act and Meaning of Collective Investment Scheme) Order 1988 SI 1988/803
Submarine Pipe-lines (Designated Owners) (No. 3) Order 1988 SI 1988/804
Submarine Pipe-lines (Designated Owners) (No. 4) Order 1988 SI 1988/805
Crown Prosecution Service (Witnesses' Allowances) (Amendment No. 7) Regulations 1988 SI 1988/807
National Health Service (Joint Ophthalmic Committees) (Scotland) Revocation Order 1988 SI 1988/808
Excise Warehousing (Etc.) Regulations 1988 SI 1988/809
Transit of Animals (Amendment) Order 1988 SI 1988/815
Teachers' Superannuation (Miscellaneous Provisions) (No. 2) Regulations 1988 SI 1988/816
Court Funds (Amendment) Rules 1988 SI 1988/817
Control of Pollution Act 1974 (Commencement No. 19) Order 1988 SI 1988/818
Collection and Disposal of Waste Regulations 1988 SI 1988/819
Housing Defects (Expenditure Limits) Order 1988 SI 1988/820
South West Water Authority (River Lew Discharge) Order 1988 SI 1988/828
A3 Trunk Road (Service Roads, Kingston upon Thames and Merton) (Restricted Roads) (Direction) Order 1988 SI 1988/829
Personal Pension Schemes (Miscellaneous Amendments) Regulations 1988 SI 1988/830
Public Telecommunication System Designation (City Centre Cable) Order 1988 SI 1988/831
County of Gwynedd (Electoral Arrangements) Order 1988 SI 1988/832
Stamp Duty Reserve Tax (Amendment) Regulations 1988 SI 1988/835
Meat and Livestock Commission Levy (Variation) Scheme (Confirmation) Order 1988 SI 1988/838
Secure Accommodation (Scotland) Amendment Regulations 1988 SI 1988/841
Road Vehicles (Excise) (Prescribed Particulars) (Amendment) Regulations 1988 SI 1988/847
Animals and Fresh Meat (Examination for Residues) Regulations 1988 SI 1988/848
Animals and Fresh Meat (Hormonal Substances) Regulations 1988 SI 1988/849
Welfare of Poultry (Transport) Order 1988 SI 1988/851
National Health Service (General Dental Services) (Scotland) Amendment Regulations 1988 SI 1988/854
Patents (Fees) Rules 1988 SI 1988/855
Registered Designs (Fees) Rules 1988 SI 1988/856
Social Security (Contributions) Amendment (No. 3) Regulations 1988 SI 1988/860
North Surrey Water Order 1988 SI 1988/861
National Health Service Functions (Directions to Authorities and Administration Arrangements) Amendment Regulations 1988 SI 1988/864
National Health Service (Payment of Remuneration — Special Arrangement) Order 1988 SI 1988/865
National Health Service (General Medical and Pharmaceutical Services and Charges for Drugs) Amendment Regulations 1988 SI 1988/866
Social Security Revaluation of Earnings Factors Order 1988 SI 1988/867
Domestic Courts (Constitution) (Amendment) Rules 1988 SI 1988/868
Domestic Courts (Constitution) (Inner London) (Amendment) Rules 1988 SI 1988/869
Matrimonial Causes Fees (Amendment) Order 1988 SI 1988/870
Building (Amendment of Prescribed Fees) Regulations 1988 SI 1988/871
Acquisition of Land (Rate of Interest after Entry) Regulations 1988 SI 1988/874
Acquisition of Land (Rate of Interest after Entry) (Scotland) Regulations 1988 SI 1988/875
Weighing Equipment (Non-automatic Weighing Machines) Regulations 1988 SI 1988/876
National Health Service (Service Committees and Tribunal) (Scotland) Amendment Regulations 1988 SI 1988/878
Public Utility Transfers and Water Charges Act 1988 (Commencement No. 1) Order 1988 SI 1988/879
Submarine Pipe-lines (Designated Owners) (No. 5) Order 1988 SI 1988/881
Submarine Pipe-lines (Designated Owners) (No. 6) Order 1988 SI 1988/882
Submarine Pipe-lines (Designated Owners) (No. 7) Order 1988 SI 1988/883
Housing Defects (Reinstatement Grant) (Amendment of Conditions for Assistance) Order 1988 SI 1988/884
Value Added Tax (Annual Accounting) Regulations 1988 SI 1988/886
Companies (Fees) Regulations 1988 SI 1988/887
Opencast Coal (Rate of Interest on Compensation) Order 1988 SI 1988/890
Trade Marks and Service Marks (Fees) Rules 1988 SI 1988/894
Weights and Measures (Knitting Yarns) Order 1988 SI 1988/895
Pressure Vessels (Verification) Regulations 1988 SI 1988/896
County Court (Amendment No. 2) Rules 1988 SI 1988/897
Wireless Telegraphy (Broadcast Licence Charges and Exemption) (Amendment No. 2) Regulations 1988 SI 1988/899
Urban Development Corporations (Appropriate Ministers) Order 1988 SI 1988/900

901-1000
Industrial Training Levy (Hotel and Catering) Order 1988 SI 1988/901
A2 Trunk Road (Rochester Way Relief Road, Greenwich and Bexley) (Speed Limits) Order 1988 SI 1988/902
Scottish Transport Group (Castle Bay Pier) Empowerment Order 1988 SI 1988/904
Caribbean Development Bank (Further Payments) Order 1988 SI 1988/906
Redundancy Payments (Local Government) (Modification) (Amendment) Order 1988 SI 1988/907
Family Credit (General) Amendment No. 2 Regulations 1988 SI 1988/908
Housing Benefit (General) Amendment No. 2 Regulations 1988 SI 1988/909
Income Support (General) Amendment No. 2 Regulations 1988 SI 1988/910
Submarine Pipe-lines (Designated Owners) (No. 8) Order 1988 SI 1988/911
Submarine Pipe-lines (Designated Owners) (No. 9) Order 1988 SI 1988/912
Magistrates' Courts (Children and Young Persons) Rules 1988 SI 1988/913
Control of Misleading Advertisements Regulations 1988 SI 1988/915
Misuse of Drugs (Amendment) Regulations 1988 SI 1988/916
(A1237) York Outer Ring Road (Northern) (Trunking) Order 1988 SI 1988/917
(A41) East of Birmingham to Birkenhead and the (A49) Shrewsbury to Warrington Trunk Roads (Whitchurch Bypass) Order 1988 SI 1988/918
Assured Tenancies (Approved Bodies) (No. 2) Order 1988 SI 1988/919
(A696) Newcastle—Edinburgh Trunk Road (Prestwick Terrace to Kenton Bank Foot De-Trunking) Order 1988 SI 1988/920
(A696) Newcastle-Edinburgh Trunk Road (Woolsington Bypass and Slip Roads) Order 1988 SI 1988/921
Legal Aid (Scotland) (Fees in Criminal Proceedings) Amendment Regulations 1988 SI 1988/922
Housing Defects (Expenditure Limits) (No. 2) Order 1988 SI 1988/923
Anglian Water Authority (Newton on Trent) Water Order 1988 SI 1988/924
Consular Fees (Amendment) Order 1988 SI 1988/925
European Committee for the Prevention of Torture and Inhuman or Degrading Treatment or Punishment (Immunities and Privileges) Order 1988 SI 1988/926
Merchant Shipping (Confirmation of Legislation) (Bermuda) Order 1988 SI 1988/927
Merchant Shipping (Confirmation of Legislation) (Cayman Islands) Order 1988 SI 1988/928
Fees &c (Northern Ireland) Order 1988 SI 1988/929
Minors' Contracts (Northern Ireland) Order 1988 SI 1988/930
Summer Time Order 1988 SI 1988/931
Double Taxation Relief (Taxes on Income) (Turkey) Order 1988 SI 1988/932
Double Taxation Relief (Taxes on Income) (Venezuela) Order 1988 SI 1988/933
Town and Country Planning (Inquiries Procedure) Rules 1988 SI 1988/944
Town and Country Planning Appeals (Determination by Inspectors) (Inquiries Procedure) Rules 1988 SI 1988/945
Insurance Brokers Registration Council (Conduct of Investment Business) Rules Approval Order 1988 SI 1988/950
Food Protection (Emergency Prohibitions) (Wales) (No. 5) Amendment No. 2 Order 1988 SI 1988/951
Crown Court (Amendment) Rules 1988 SI 1988/952
Export of Sheep (Prohibition) (No. 2) Amendment No. 2 Order 1988 SI 1988/953
Food Protection (Emergency Prohibitions) (England) Amendment No. 2 Order 1988 SI 1988/954
Norfolk and Suffolk Broads Act 1988 (Commencement) Order 1988 SI 1988/955
Local Government (Direct Labour Organisations) (Competition) (Scotland) Amendment Regulations 1988 SI 1988/956
Coast Protection (Notices) (Scotland) Regulations 1988 SI 1988/957
Consumer Protection (Cancellation of Contracts Concluded away from Business Premises) (Amendment) Regulations 1988 SI 1988/958
Heavy Goods Vehicles (Drivers' Licences) (Amendment) Regulations 1988 SI 1988/959
Public Service Vehicles (Drivers' Licences) (Amendment) Regulations 1988 SI 1988/960
Social Security Act 1986 (Consequential) Amendment Regulations 1988 SI 1988/961
British Transport (Alteration of Pension Schemes) (Amendment) Order 1988 SI 1988/962
Town and Country Planning (Tree Preservation Order) (Amendment) Regulations 1988 SI 1988/963
Food Protection (Emergency Prohibitions) Amendment Order 1988 Approved by both Houses of Parliament SI 1988/964
Motor Vehicles (Driving Licences) (Amendment) Regulations 1988 SI 1988/965
Sheriff Court Fees Amendment Order 1988 SI 1988/966
Rate Limitation (Designation of Authorities) (Exemption) (Wales) Order 1988 SI 1988/968
Court of Session etc. Fees Amendment (No.2) Order 1988 SI 1988/969
Forestry (Exceptions from Restriction of Felling) (Amendment) Regulations 1988 SI 1988/970
Restriction on Movement of Spruce Wood (Amendment) Order 1988 SI 1988/971
Docks and Harbours (Rateable Values) (Amendment) Order 1988 SI 1988/974
Medicines (Medicated Animal Feeding Stuffs) Regulations 1988 SI 1988/976
Town and Country Planning (General Development) (Scotland) Amendment Order 1988 SI 1988/977
Housing Defects (Reinstatement Grant) (Amendment of Conditions for Assistance) (Scotland) Order 1988 SI 1988/978
Local Government Act 1988 (Commencement No. 1) Order 1988 SI 1988/979
Gas (Meters) (Amendment) Regulations 1988 SI 1988/980
Submarine Pipe-lines (Designated Owners) (No. 10) Order 1988 SI 1988/981
Submarine Pipe-lines (Designated Owners) (No. 11) Order 1988 SI 1988/982
Submarine Pipe-lines (Designated Owners) (No. 12) Order 1988 SI 1988/983
Motor Vehicles (Tests) (Amendment) (No.2) Regulations 1988 SI 1988/989
Consumer Credit (Exempt Agreements) (No. 2) (Amendment No. 2) Order 1988 SI 1988/991
Social Security (Contributions) Amendment (No. 4) Regulations 1988 SI 1988/992
Personal Pension Schemes (Establishment of Schemes) Order 1988 SI 1988/993
Esk Salmon Fishery District Designation Order 1988 SI 1988/994
Financial Services Act 1986 (Commencement) (No. 9) Order 1988 SI 1988/995
London Cab Order 1988 SI 1988/996
Measuring Equipment (Cold-water Meters) Regulations 1988 SI 1988/997
Commissioners for Oaths (Fees) (No. 2) Order 1988 SI 1988/998
Family Credit and Income Support (General) Amendment Regulations 1988 SI 1988/999
Intervention Functions (Delegation) (Amendment) Regulations 1988 SI 1988/1000

1001-1100
Cereals Co-responsibility Levy Regulations 1988 SI 1988/1001
Income and Corporation Taxes Act 1988 (Appointed Day No. 2) Order 1988 SI 1988/1002
Northern Ireland (Emergency Provisions) Act 1987 (Commencement No. 2) Order 1988 SI 1988/1005
Medicines (Labelling of Medicinal Products for Incorporation in Animal Feeding Stuffs and of Medicated Animal Feeding Stuffs) Regulations 1988 SI 1988/1009
Merchant Shipping Act 1988 (Commencement No. 1) Order 1988 SI 1988/1010
Income Tax (Building Societies) (Amendment) Regulations 1988 SI 1988/1011
Personal Pension Schemes (Minimum Contributions under the Social Security Act 1986) Regulations 1988 SI 1988/1012
Personal Pension Schemes (Relief at Source) Regulations 1988 SI 1988/1013
Personal Pension Schemes (Transfer Payments) Regulations 1988 SI 1988/1014
Medicines (Exemptions from Restrictions on the Retail Sale or Supply of Veterinary Drugs) (Amendment) Order 1988 SI 1988/1015
Personal and Occupational Pension Schemes (Transfer to Self-employed Pension Arrangements) Regulations 1988 SI 1988/1016
Restriction on Conduct (Specialist Advertising Services) Order 1988 SI 1988/1017
Video Recordings Act 1984 (Commencement No. 7) Order 1988 SI 1988/1018
London Government Reorganisation (Transfer of Loans) (Amendment) Order 1988 SI 1988/1019
Education (School Information) (Amendment) Regulations 1988 SI 1988/1023
Stanswood Bay Oyster Fishery Order 1988 SI 1988/1024
Amusements with Prizes (Variation of Monetary Limits) Order 1988 SI 1988/1025
Gaming Act (Variation of Monetary Limits) Order 1988 SI 1988/1026
Gaming Clubs (Hours and Charges) (Amendment) Regulations 1988 SI 1988/1027
Gaming (Small Charges) (Amendment) Order 1988 SI 1988/1028
National Savings Bank (Investment Deposits) (Limits) (Amendment) Order 1988 SI 1988/1030
Motor Cycles (Eye Protectors) (Amendment) Regulations 1988 SI 1988/1031
Act of Sederunt (Rules of the Court of Session Amendment No.3) (Shorthand Writers' Fees) 1988 SI 1988/1032
Act of Sederunt (Shorthand Writers' Fees) 1988 SI 1988/1033
Road Traffic Act 1972 (Amendment) Regulations 1988 SI 1988/1036
Transport Act 1981 (Commencement No. 12) Order 1988 SI 1988/1037
Bovine Spongiform Encephalopathy Order 1988 SI 1988/1039
Gloucester Harbour Revision Order 1988 SI 1988/1040
Education Authority Bursaries (Scotland) Regulations 1988 SI 1988/1042
Local Government Act 1988 (Commencement No.2) (Scotland) Order 1988 SI 1988/1043
AIDS (Control) (Contents of Reports) (No. 2) Order 1988 SI 1988/1047
Water (Meters) Regulations 1988 SI 1988/1048
Trunk Road A1081 (Bell Roundabout — London Colney Roundabout, Hertfordshire) (Detrunking) Order 1988 SI 1988/1049
Gaming Act (Variation of Monetary Limits) (Scotland) Order 1988 SI 1988/1050
Gaming (Small Charges) (Scotland) Amendment Order 1988 SI 1988/1051
Gaming Clubs (Hours and Charges) (Scotland) Amendment Regulations 1988 SI 1988/1052
Amusements with Prizes (Variation of Monetary Limits) (Scotland) Order 1988 SI 1988/1053
Crown Prosecution Service (Witnesses' Allowances) (Amendment No. 8) Regulations 1988 SI 1988/1054
Education (School Teachers' Pay and Conditions) Order 1988 SI 1988/1055
Agriculture Improvement (Variation) Scheme 1988 SI 1988/1056
Electricity Supply Regulations 1988 SI 1988/1057
Financial Services (Disclosure of Information) (Designated Authorities) (No. 4) Order 1988 SI 1988/1058
(A47) Birmingham-Great Yarmouth Trunk Road (Easton Hornstocks Bends Improvement) Order 1988 SI 1988/1060
Motor Vehicles (Driving Licences) (Amendment) (No. 2) Regulations 1988 SI 1988/1062
Customs Duties (ECSC) (Amendment No. 1) Order 1988 SI 1988/1065
London-Portsmouth Trunk Road A3 (Ham Barn-Petersfield Section Slip Roads) (No. 2) Order 1988 SI 1988/1066
Education (Special Educational Needs) (Amendment) Regulations 1988 SI 1988/1067
Charities (University of Liverpool) Order 1988 SI 1988/1068
Magistrates' Courts (Increase of Lump Sums) Order 1988 SI 1988/1069
National Health Service (General Medical and Pharmaceutical Services and Charges for Drugs) (Scotland) Amendment Regulations 1988 SI 1988/1073
(A43) Oxford—Market Deeping Trunk Road (Moulton Crossroads to Overstone Grange Improvement) Order 1988 SI 1988/1077
Video Recordings Act 1984 (Scotland) (Commencement No.7) Order 1988 SI 1988/1079
Offshore Installations (Safety Zones) Order 1988 SI 1988/1080
Offshore Installations (Safety Zones) (No. 2) Order 1988 SI 1988/1081
Crown Office (Forms and Proclamations Rules) Order 1988 SI 1988/1082
Child Abduction and Custody (Parties to Conventions) (Amendment) (No. 2) Order 1988 SI 1988/1083
Environment Protection (Overseas Territories) Order 1988 SI 1988/1084
Merchant Shipping (Tonnage) (Overseas Territories) Order 1988 SI 1988/1085
Merchant Shipping Act 1970 (Overseas Territories) Order 1988 SI 1988/1086
Employment and Training (Amendment) (Northern Ireland) Order 1988 SI 1988/1087
Lord Chancellor's Salary Order 1988 SI 1988/1088
Terms of Employment of Pilots (Arbitration) Regulations 1988 SI 1988/1089
Veterinary Surgery (Blood Sampling) (Amendment) Order 1988 SI 1988/1090
Social Work (Residential Establishments-Child Care) (Scotland) Amendment Regulations 1988 SI 1988/1091
Residential Care Order (Secure Accommodation) (Scotland) Amendment Regulations 1988 SI 1988/1092
Local Government Reorganisation (Property) (Tyne and Wear) Order 1988 SI 1988/1093
Sutton District Water Order 1988 SI 1988/1094
Ministry of Defence Police (Police Committee) Regulations 1988 SI 1988/1098
Ministry of Defence Police (Representation at Disciplinary Proceedings) Regulations 1988 SI 1988/1099
Industrial Training Orders (Amendment) Order 1988 SI 1988/1100

1101-1200
Heavy Goods Vehicles (Drivers' Licences) (Amendment) (No. 2) Regulations 1988 SI 1988/1101
Road Vehicles (Construction and Use) (Amendment) (No. 2) Regulations 1988 SI 1988/1102
Motor Vehicles (Type Approval) (Amendment) Regulations 1988 SI 1988/1103
Public Service Vehicles (Drivers' Licences) (Amendment) (No. 2) Regulations 1988 SI 1988/1104
Northern Ireland (Emergency Provisions) Act 1987 (Commencement No. 2) Order 1988 SI 1988/1105
National Health Service (General Medical and Pharmaceutical Services) Amendment Regulations 1988 SI 1988/1106
Civil Legal Aid (Scotland) (Fees) Amendment SI 1988/1107
Legal Aid (Scotland) (Fees in Civil Proceedings) Amendment (No.2) Regulations 1988 SI 1988/1108
Criminal Legal Aid (Scotland) (Fees) Amendment (No.2) Regulations 1988 SI 1988/1109
Legal Advice and Assistance (Scotland) Amendment Regulations 1988 SI 1988/1110
Legal Aid (Scotland) (Fees in Criminal Proceedings) Amendment (No.2) Regulations 1988 SI 1988/1111
Trade Marks and Service Marks (Amendment) Rules 1988 SI 1988/1112
Merchant Shipping (Medical Stores) (Amendment) Regulations 1988 SI 1988/1116
Employment Act 1988 (Commencement No. 1) Order 1988 SI 1988/1118
Prosecution of Offences Act 1985 (Specified Proceedings) (Amendment) Order 1988 SI 1988/1121
Funds for Trade Union Ballots (Amendment) Regulations 1988 SI 1988/1123
Value Added Tax (Special Provisions) (Amendment) Order 1988 SI 1988/1124
Farm Business Non-Capital Grant Scheme 1988 SI 1988/1125
Criminal Legal Aid (Scotland) Amendment Regulations 1988 SI 1988/1126
Customs Duties (Quota Relief) Order 1988 SI 1988/1127
Measuring Instruments (EEC Requirements) (Amendment) Regulations 1988 SI 1988/1128
Dartford-Thurrock Crossing Act 1988 (Appointed Day) Order 1988 SI 1988/1129
Road Vehicles (Registration and Licensing) (Amendment) Regulations (Northern Ireland) 1988 SI 1988/1130
Advice and Assistance (Scotland) Amendment (No.2) Regulations 1988 SI 1988/1131
Home-Grown Cereals Authority (Rate of Levy) Order 1988 SI 1988/1132
Immigration Act 1988 (Commencement No. 1) Order 1988 SI 1988/1133
Immigration (Restricted Right of Appeal against Deportation) (Exemption) Order 1988 SI 1988/1134
Pilotage Act 1987 (Commencement No. 3) Order 1988 SI 1988/1137
Air Navigation (Restriction of Flying) (Nuclear Installations) Regulations 1988 SI 1988/1138
Building Societies (Commercial Assets and Services) Order 1988 SI 1988/1141
Building Societies (Limits on Commercial Assets) Order 1988 SI 1988/1142
Land Registration (Scotland) Amendment Rules 1988 SI 1988/1143
Central Manchester Development Corporation (Area and Constitution) Order 1988 SI 1988/1144
Leeds Development Corporation (Area and Constitution) Order 1988 SI 1988/1145
Sheffield Development Corporation (Area and Constitution) Order 1988 SI 1988/1146
Wolverhampton Urban Development Area Order 1988 SI 1988/1147
Building Societies (Transfer of Business) Regulations 1988 SI 1988/1153
Crown Office (Preparation and Authentication of Documents Rules) Order 1988 SI 1988/1162
St. Mary's Music School (Aided Places) Amendment Regulations 1988 SI 1988/1163
Education (Assisted Places) (Scotland) Amendment Regulations 1988 SI 1988/1164
Public Utility Transfers and Water Charges Act 1988 (Commencement No. 2) Order 1988 SI 1988/1165
National Savings Bank (Amendment) Regulations 1988 SI 1988/1166
Post Office Register (Trustee Savings Banks) (Revocation) Regulations 1988 SI 1988/1167
Trustee Savings Banks Act 1985 (Appointed Day) (No. 6) Order 1988 SI 1988/1168
Vaccine Damage Payments (Amendment) Regulations 1988 SI 1988/1169
Transport Act 1981 (Commencement No. 13) Order 1988 SI 1988/1170
Civil Legal Aid (Scotland) Amendment (No.2) Regulations 1988 SI 1988/1171
London—Birmingham Trunk Road (A41) (M25 Interchange) (Trunking and De-trunking) Order 1988 SI 1988/1172
A405 Trunk Road (Bricket Wood Junction) (Trunking) Order 1988 SI 1988/1173
Value Added Tax (Goods Imported for Private Purposes) Relief Order 1988 SI 1988/1174
Church of England (Legal Aid) Rules 1988 SI 1988/1175
A127 London—Southend Trunk Road (Rayleigh Weir Improvement) Slip Roads Order 1988 SI 1988/1176
Road Vehicles (Construction and Use) (Amendment) (No. 3) Regulations 1988 SI 1988/1177
Road Vehicles (Construction and Use) (Amendment) (No. 4) Regulations 1988 SI 1988/1178
Unitary Development Plans (Merseyside) (Appointed Day) Order 1988 SI 1988/1179
Pig Carcase (Grading) Regulations 1988 SI 1988/1180
Northern Ireland Act 1974 (Interim Period Extension) Order 1988 SI 1988/1181
Measuring Instruments (EEC Requirements) (Fees) Regulations 1988 SI 1988/1184
Pupils' Registration (Amendment) Regulations 1988 SI 1988/1185
Licensing (Fees) (Amendment) Order 1988 SI 1988/1186
Licensing Act 1988 (Commencement No. 1) Order 1988 SI 1988/1187
Licensing (Extended Hours Orders) (Amendment) Rules 1988 SI 1988/1188
Nursing Homes and Mental Nursing Homes (Amendment) Regulations 1988 SI 1988/1191
Residential Care Homes (Amendment) Regulations 1988 SI 1988/1192
Value Added Tax (Imported Goods) Relief (Amendment) Order 1988 SI 1988/1193
Building Societies (Designation of Qualifying Bodies) Order 1988 SI 1988/1196
Building Societies (Limits on Lending) Order 1988 SI 1988/1197
Blood Tests (Evidence of Paternity) (Amendment) Regulations 1988 SI 1988/1198
Town and Country Planning (Assessment of Environmental Effects) Regulations 1988 SI 1988/1199
Police and Criminal Evidence Act 1984 (Codes of Practice) Order 1988 SI 1988/1200

1201-1300
Agriculture Improvement (Amendment) Regulations 1988 SI 1988/1201
Immigration (Restricted Right of Appeal against Deportation) (Exemption) (No. 2) Order 1988 SI 1988/1203
Meters (Determination of Questions) (Expenses) Regulations 1988 SI 1988/1206
Environmental Assessment (Afforestation) Regulations 1988 SI 1988/1207
Education (Assisted Places) (Amendment) Regulations 1988 SI 1988/1210
Education (Assisted Places) (Incidental Expenses) (Amendment) Regulations 1988 SI 1988/1211
Education (Grants) (Music and Ballet Schools) (Amendment) Regulations 1988 SI 1988/1212
Petroleum (Production) (Seaward Areas) Regulations 1988 SI 1988/1213
Education Support Grants (Amendment) Regulations 1988 SI 1988/1214
Wireless Telegraphy (Citizens' Band and Amateur Apparatus) (Various Provisions) Order 1988 SI 1988/1215
Wireless Telegraphy (Control of Interference from Citizens' Band Radio Apparatus) (Amendment) Regulations 1988 SI 1988/1216
Land Drainage Improvement Works (Assessment of Environmental Effects) Regulations 1988 SI 1988/1217
Environmental Assessment (Salmon Farming in Marine Waters) Regulations 1988 SI 1988/1218
British Waterways Board (Rateable Values) (Scotland) Amendment Order 1988 SI 1988/1219
Docks and Harbours (Rateable Values) (Scotland) Amendment Order 1988 SI 1988/1220
Environmental Assessment (Scotland) Regulations 1988 SI 1988/1221
Health and Safety (Training for Employment) Regulations 1988 SI 1988/1222
Bournemouth and District Water Company (Amendment of Local Enactments) Order 1988 SI 1988/1224
Newcastle and Gateshead Water (Birch Trees No. 3 Spring) Order 1988 SI 1988/1225
Social Security Act 1988 (Commencement No. 2) Order 1988 SI 1988/1226
Child Benefit (General) Amendment Regulations 1988 SI 1988/1227
Income Support (General) Amendment No. 3 Regulations 1988 SI 1988/1228
Income Support (Transitional) Regulations 1988 SI 1988/1229
Social Security (Credits) Amendment (No. 2) Regulations 1988 SI 1988/1230
Submarine Pipe-lines (Designated Owners) (No. 13) Order 1988 SI 1988/1232
Submarine Pipe-lines (Designated Owners) (No. 14) Order 1988 SI 1988/1233
Submarine Pipe-lines (Designated Owners) (No. 15) Order 1988 SI 1988/1234
Submarine Pipe-lines (Designated Owners) (No. 16) Order 1988 SI 1988/1235
Submarine Pipe-lines (Designated Owners) (No. 17) Order 1988 SI 1988/1236
Submarine Pipe-lines (Designated Owners) (No. 18) Order 1988 SI 1988/1237
Submarine Pipe-lines (Designated Owners) (No. 19) Order 1988 SI 1988/1238
Homes Insulation Grants Order 1988 SI 1988/1239
Assured Tenancies (Approved Bodies) (Amendment) Order 1988 SI 1988/1240
Highways (Assessment of Environmental Effects) Regulations 1988 SI 1988/1241
Gipsy Encampments (District of Lewes) Order 1988 SI 1988/1242
Town and Country Planning (General Development) (Scotland) Amendment (No.2) Order 1988 SI 1988/1249
Gaming (Amendment) Act 1986 (Commencement) Order 1988 SI 1988/1250
Gaming (Records of Cheques) Regulations 1988 SI 1988/1251
Redundant Mineworkers and Concessionary Coal (Payments Schemes) (Amendment) Order 1988 SI 1988/1252
London—Penzance Trunk Road A30 (Penhale to Carland Cross Improvement and Slip Roads) Order 1988 SI 1988/1256
London-Penzance Trunk Road A30 (Penhale to Carland Cross Improvement) (Detrunking) Order 1988 SI 1988/1257
Housing (Contributions Towards Expenditure for Area Improvement) Order 1988 SI 1988/1258
Customs Duties (Spain and Portugal) (Revocation) Order 1988 SI 1988/1259
Customs Duties (Portugal) Order 1988 SI 1988/1260
Customs Duties (Spain) Order 1988 SI 1988/1261
Children and Young Persons (Amendment) Act 1986 (Commencement No. 1) Order 1988 SI 1988/1262
Grants by Local Housing Authorities (Eligible Expense Limits) Order 1988 SI 1988/1263
Sole (Specified Sea Areas) (Prohibition of Fishing) Order 1988 SI 1988/1264
Housing (Right to Buy) (Prescribed Forms) (Welsh Forms) Regulations 1988 SI 1988/1265
Cereals Co-responsibility Levy (Certified Seed Exemption) Regulations 1988 SI 1988/1267
Smoke Control Areas (Authorised Fuels) (Scotland) Regulations 1988 SI 1988/1270
Electricity (Miscellaneous Pension Schemes) (Winding Up) Regulations 1988 SI 1988/1271
Town and Country Planning General Development (Amendment) Order 1988 SI 1988/1272
Ecclesiastical Judges and Legal Officers (Fees) Order 1988 SI 1988/1273
Merchant Shipping (Weighing of Goods Vehicles and other Cargo) Regulations 1988 SI 1988/1275
Estate Duty (Interest on Unpaid Duty) Order 1988 SI 1988/1276
Estate Duty (Northern Ireland) (Interest on Unpaid Duty) Order 1988 SI 1988/1277
Income Tax (Interest on Unpaid Tax and Repayment Supplement) (No. 2) Order 1988 SI 1988/1278
Income Tax (Official Rate of Interest on Beneficial Loans) (No. 2) Order 1988 SI 1988/1279
Inheritance Tax and Capital Transfer Tax (Interest on Unpaid Tax) Order 1988 SI 1988/1280
Stamp Duty Reserve Tax (Interest on Tax Repaid) (No.2) Order 1988 SI 1988/1281
Value Added Tax (Training) Order 1988 SI 1988/1282
Landlord and Tenant Act 1987 (Commencement No. 3) Order 1988  SI 1988/1283
Service Charge Contributions (Authorised Investments) Order 1988 SI 1988/1284
Service Charge (Estimates and Consultation) Order 1988 SI 1988/1285
Rate Support Grant (Scotland) Order 1988 Approved by the House of Commons SI 1988/1286
Road Vehicles (Construction and Use) (Amendment) (No.5) Regulations 1988 SI 1988/1287
Water (Meters) (Amendment) Regulations 1988 SI 1988/1288
Farm Woodland Scheme 1988 SI 1988/1291
Food Protection (Emergency Prohibitions) (England) Amendment No.3 Order 1988 SI 1988/1292
Army, Air Force and Naval Discipline Acts (Continuation) Order 1988 SI 1988/1293
Naval Medical Compassionate Fund (Amendment) Order 1988 SI 1988/1294
Service Departments Registers (Amendment) Order 1988 SI 1988/1295
Antarctic Treaty (Agreed Measures) (No. 2) Order 1988 SI 1988/1296
Copyright (Singapore) (Amendment) Order 1988 SI 1988/1297
EUMETSAT (Immunities and Privileges) Order 1988 SI 1988/1298
EUTELSAT (Immunities and Privileges) Order 1988 SI 1988/1299
Multilateral Investment Guarantee Agency (Overseas Territories) (Amendment) Order 1988 SI 1988/1300

1301-1400
Appropriation (No. 2) (Northern Ireland) Order 1988 SI 1988/1301
Farm Businesses (Northern Ireland) Order 1988 SI 1988/1302
Sex Discrimination (Northern Ireland) Order 1988 SI 1988/1303
Reciprocal Enforcement of Foreign Judgments (Canada) (Amendment) Order 1988 SI 1988/1304
General Optical Council (Contact Lens (Qualifications etc.) Rules) Order of Council 1988 SI 1988/1305
Local Government Administration (Matters Subject to Investigation) (Scotland) Order 1988 SI 1988/1306
Copyright (International Conventions) (Amendment No. 2) Order 1988 SI 1988/1307
Black Country Development Corporation (Vesting of Land) (Borough of Sandwell) Order 1988 SI 1988/1308
Black Country Development Corporation (Vesting of Land) (Borough of Walsall) Order 1988 SI 1988/1309
Black Country Development Corporation (Vesting of Land) (British Railways Board) Order 1988 SI 1988/1310
Black Country Development Corporation (Vesting of Land) (Central Electricity Generating Board) Order 1988 SI 1988/1311
Black Country Development Corporation (Vesting of Land) (General) Order 1988 SI 1988/1312
Tyne and Wear Development Corporation (Vesting of Land) (Port of Tyne Authority) Order 1988 SI 1988/1313
Customs Duties (ECSC) (Amendment No. 2) Order 1988 SI 1988/1314
Tyne and Wear Development Corporation (Vesting of Land) (British Coal Corporation) Order 1988 SI 1988/1315
Tyne and Wear Development Corporation (Vesting of Land) (British Shipbuilders and British Steel Corporation) Order 1988 SI 1988/1316
Black Country Development Corporation (Vesting of Land) (British Steel Corporation) Order 1988 SI 1988/1317
Tyne and Wear Development Corporation (Vesting of Land) (City of Newcastle upon Tyne) Order 1988 SI 1988/1318
Tyne and Wear Development Corporation (Vesting of Land) (Various Local Authorities) Order 1988 SI 1988/1319
Tyne and Wear Development Corporation (Vesting of Land) (Borough of Sunderland) Order 1988 SI 1988/1320
Tyne and Wear Development Corporation (Vesting of Land) (Tyne and Wear Passenger Transport Executive) Order 1988 SI 1988/1321
Crown Court (Amendment) (No. 2) Rules 1988 SI 1988/1322
Public Charitable Collections (Scotland) Amendment Regulations 1988 SI 1988/1323
Furniture and Furnishings (Fire) (Safety) Regulations 1988 SI 1988/1324
Parochial Fees Order 1988 SI 1988/1327
Matrimonial Causes (Costs) Rules 1988 SI 1988/1328
Food Protection (Emergency Prohibitions) (Wales) (No. 5) Amendment No. 3 Order 1988 SI 1988/1329
Licensing Act 1988 (Commencement No. 2) Order 1988 SI 1988/1333
Companies (Disclosure of Information) (Designated Authorities) Order 1988 SI 1988/1334
London Government Reorganisation (Property) Order 1988 SI 1988/1335
Harbour Works (Assessment of Environmental Effects) Regulations 1988 SI 1988/1336
Licensing (Special Hours Certificates) (Amendment) Rules 1988 SI 1988/1338
Police Pensions (Amendment) Regulations 1988 SI 1988/1339
Rules of the Supreme Court (Amendment No. 2) 1988 SI 1988/1340
Administration of Justice Act 1985 (Commencement No. 5) Order 1988 SI 1988/1341
Reimbursement of Costs (Monetary Limit) Order 1988 SI 1988/1342
Value Added Tax (Repayment Supplement) Regulations 1988 SI 1988/1343
Building Societies (Prescribed Contracts) Order 1988 SI 1988/1344
Bovine Spongiform Encephalopathy (Amendment) Order 1988 SI 1988/1345
Bovine Spongiform Encephalopathy Compensation Order 1988 SI 1988/1346
Income Tax (Interest Relief) (Housing Associations) Regulations 1988 SI 1988/1347
Personal Equity Plan (Amendment No. 2) Regulations 1988 SI 1988/1348
Textile Products (Determination of Composition) (Amendment) Regulations 1988 SI 1988/1349
Textile Products (Indications of Fibre Content) (Amendment) Regulations 1988 SI 1988/1350
A47 Leicester—Great Yarmouth Trunk Road (Norwich Southern Bypass and Slip Roads) (Western Section) Order 1988 SI 1988/1351
Set-Aside Regulations 1988 SI 1988/1352
Food Protection (Emergency Prohibitions) Amendment No.2 Order 1988 SI 1988/1353
Finance Act 1988 (Repayment Supplement) (Appointed Day) Order 1988 SI 1988/1354
National Savings Stock Register (Amendment) Regulations 1988 SI 1988/1355
Premium Savings Bonds (Amendment) Regulations 1988 SI 1988/1356
Savings Certificates (Yearly Plan) (Amendment) Regulations 1988 SI 1988/1357
Savings Contracts (Amendment) Regulations 1988 SI 1988/1358
Companies (Forms) (Amendment) Regulations 1988 SI 1988/1359
Education (Mandatory Awards) Regulations 1988 SI 1988/1360
Legal Aid Act 1988 (Commencement No. 1) Order 1988 SI 1988/1361
Fire Services (Appointments and Promotion) (Amendment) (No. 2) Regulations 1988 SI 1988/1362
Social Security (Contribution Conditions for Unemployment and Sickness Benefit) Transitional Regulations 1988 SI 1988/1363
Dartford—Thurrock Crossing Tolls Order 1988 SI 1988/1364
Education (Welsh Medium Teacher Training Incentive Supplement) Regulations 1988 SI 1988/1365
Cable Programme Services (Exceptions) Order 1988 SI 1988/1370
Local Government Act 1988 (Defined Activities) (Competition) (England) Regulations 1988 SI 1988/1371
Local Government Act 1988 (Defined Activities) (Exemptions) (England) Order 1988 SI 1988/1372
Local Government Act 1988 (Defined Activities) (Specified Periods) (England) Regulations 1988 SI 1988/1373
Teachers' Superannuation (Amendment) Regulations 1988 SI 1988/1374
British Steel Act 1988 (Appointed Day) Order 1988 SI 1988/1375
British Steel Act 1988 (Nominated Company) Order 1988 SI 1988/1376
Statutory Water Companies (Occupational Pension Schemes) Regulations 1988 SI 1988/1377
Pesticides (Maximum Residue Levels in Food) Regulations 1988 SI 1988/1378
Welsh Water Authority (Extension of Operation of Byelaws) Order 1988 SI 1988/1380
Sheriffs' Fees (Amendment) Order 1988 SI 1988/1384
Public Record Office (Fees) Regulations 1988 SI 1988/1385
A406 London North Circular Trunk Road (East London River Crossing (A13 to A2) Supplementary Trunk Road and Slip Roads) Order 1988 SI 1988/1386
A406 London North Circular Trunk Road (East London River Crossing (A13 to A2) Trunk Road and Slip Roads) Order 1988 SI 1988/1387
Legal Aid Act 1988 (Commencement No. 2) (Scotland) Order 1988 SI 1988/1388
Advice and Assistance (Scotland) (Prospective Cost) Regulations 1988 SI 1988/1389
Advice and Assistance (Assistance by Way of Representation) (Scotland) Amendment Regulations 1988 SI 1988/1390
Education (Fees and Awards) (Amendment) Regulations 1988 SI 1988/1391
State Awards (Amendment) Regulations 1988 SI 1988/1392
Building Societies (Designation of Qualifying Bodies) (Amendment) Order 1988 SI 1988/1393
Building Societies (Guernsey and Alderney) Order 1988 SI 1988/1394
Royal Marines Terms of Service Regulations 1988 SI 1988/1395
Merchant Shipping (Health and Safety: General Duties) (Amendment) Regulations 1988 SI 1988/1396
Education (Bursaries for Teacher Training) Regulations 1988 SI 1988/1397
Farm Diversification Grant (Variation) Scheme 1988 SI 1988/1398
Black Country Development Corporation (Planning Functions) (Wolverhampton) Order 1988 SI 1988/1399
Town and Country Planning (Wolverhampton Urban Development Area) Special Development Order 1988 SI 1988/1400

1401-1500
British Shipbuilders Borrowing Powers (Increase of Limit) Order 1988 SI 1988/1401
Criminal Justice Act 1988 (Commencement No. 1) Order 1988 SI 1988/1408
Social Security (Employment Training: Payments) Order 1988 SI 1988/1409
Peterborough Development Corporation (Transfer of Property and Dissolution) Order 1988 SI 1988/1410
Local Government Act 1988 (Defined Activities) (Competition) (Scotland) Regulations 1988 SI 1988/1413
Local Government Act 1988 (Defined Activities) (Specified Periods) (Scotland) Regulations 1988 SI 1988/1414
Local Government Act 1988 (Defined Activities) (Exemptions) (Scotland) Order 1988 SI 1988/1415
Gaming (Records of Cheques) (Scotland) Regulations 1988 SI 1988/1416
Judicial Pensions (Personal Pension Option) Regulations 1988 SI 1988/1417
Judicial Pensions (Preservation of Benefits) Order 1988 SI 1988/1418
Judicial Pensions (Preserved Benefits and Personal Pension Option) Order 1988 SI 1988/1419
Judicial Pensions (Requisite Benefits) Order 1988 SI 1988/1420
Prison (Amendment) (No. 3) Rules 1988 SI 1988/1421
Young Offender Institution Rules 1988 SI 1988/1422
Education Authority Bursaries (Scotland) Amendment Regulations 1988 SI 1988/1423
Students' Allowances (Scotland) Amendment Regulations 1988 SI 1988/1424
National Health Service (Payments for Optical Appliances) (Scotland) Amendment (No.3) Regulations 1988 SI 1988/1425
Import and Export (Plant Health Fees) (England and Wales) Order 1988 SI 1988/1427
Agricultural Holdings (Units of Production) Order 1988 SI 1988/1428
National Health Service (Payments for Optical Appliances) Amendment (No. 3) Regulations 1988 SI 1988/1435
Occupational Pension Schemes (Transitional Provisions) Regulations 1988 SI 1988/1436
Personal Pension Schemes (Provisional Approval) (Amendment) Regulations 1988 SI 1988/1437
Family Credit (General) Amendment No. 3 Regulations 1988 SI 1988/1438
Social Security (Credits) Amendment (No. 3) Regulations 1988 SI 1988/1439
A12 Trunk Road (Leyton Way, Waltham Forest) (Prescribed Routes) Order 1988 SI 1988/1443
Housing Benefit (General) Amendment No. 3 Regulations 1988 SI 1988/1444
Income Support (General) Amendment No. 4 Regulations 1988 SI 1988/1445
Social Security (Overlapping Benefits) Amendment Regulations 1988 SI 1988/1446
Central Institutions (Recognition) (Scotland) Regulations 1988 SI 1988/1447
Dundee College of Technology (Change of Name) Regulations 1988 SI 1988/1448
Napier College of Commerce and Technology (Change of Name) Regulations 1988 SI 1988/1449
Diseases of Animals (Approved Disinfectants) (Amendment) (No. 2) Order 1988 SI 1988/1453
National Health Service (General Medical and Pharmaceutical Services) (Scotland) Amendment (No.2) Regulations 1988 SI 1988/1454
Local Government Finance Act 1988 Commencement (Scotland) Order 1988 SI 1988/1456
Gipsy Encampments (City of Durham) Order 1988 SI 1988/1458
Education Reform Act 1988 (Commencement No. 1) Order 1988 SI 1988/1459
Control of Industrial Major Accident Hazards (Amendment) Regulations 1988 SI 1988/1462
Industrial Training Levy (Clothing and Allied Products) Order 1988 SI 1988/1463
Liquor Licensing (Fees) (Scotland) Order 1988 SI 1988/1464
East of Birmingham — Birkenhead Trunk Road (A41 Handley Bypass) Order 1988 SI 1988/1466
Grants by Local Housing Authorities (Eligible Expense Limits) (No. 2) Order 1988 SI 1988/1467
Local Government Act 1988 (Defined Activities) (Competition) (Wales) Regulations 1988 SI 1988/1468
Local Government Act 1988 (Defined Activities) (Exemptions) (Wales) Order 1988 SI 1988/1469
Local Government Act 1988 (Defined Activities) (Specified Periods) (Wales) Regulations 1988 SI 1988/1470
Education (Parental Ballots for Acquisition of Grant-maintained Status) (Prescribed Body) Regulations 1988 SI 1988/1474
Grants by Local Housing Authorities (Appropriate Percentage and Exchequer Contributions) (No. 2) Order 1988 SI 1988/1475
Customs and Excise (Common Transit) Regulations 1988 SI 1988/1476
Abolition of Domestic Rates (Domestic and Part Residential Subjects) (Scotland) Regulations 1988 SI 1988/1477
Goods Vehicles (Plating and Testing) Regulations 1988 SI 1988/1478
Berry Head and Berry Head (Southern Redoubt) (Areas of Special Protection) (Amendment) Order 1988 SI 1988/1479
Whitehaven (Pilotage) Harbour Revision Order 1988 SI 1988/1480
Offshore Installations (Safety Zones) (No. 3) Order 1988 SI 1988/1481
Offshore Installations (Safety Zones) (Amendment) Order 1988 SI 1988/1482
Housing Benefit (Social Security Act 1986 Modifications) (Scotland) Regulations 1988 SI 1988/1483
Food (Meat Inspection) (Scotland) Regulations 1988 SI 1988/1484
Merchant Shipping (Fees) Regulations 1988 SI 1988/1485
International Bank for Reconstruction and Development (1988 General Capital Increase) Order 1988 SI 1988/1486
Export of Goods (Control) (Amendment) Order 1988 SI 1988/1487
Dock Workers (Regulation of Employment) (Amendment) Order 1988 SI 1988/1492
Mersey Docks and Harbour Revision Order 1988 SI 1988/1493
Fishguard (Pilotage) Harbour Revision Order 1988 SI 1988/1494
Penzance and Newlyn (Pilotage) Harbour Revision Order 1988 SI 1988/1495
Teignmouth (Pilotage) Harbour Revision Order 1988 SI 1988/1496
Shoreham (Pilotage) Harbour Revision Order 1988 SI 1988/1497
Port of Ramsgate (Pilotage) Harbour Revision Order 1988 SI 1988/1499
St Ives (Pilotage) Harbour Revision Order 1988 SI 1988/1500

1501-1600
Police (Scotland) Amendment Regulations 1988 SI 1988/1501
Act of Sederunt (Fees of Sheriff Officers) 1988 SI 1988/1502
Act of Sederunt (Fees of Messengers-at-Arms) 1988 SI 1988/1503
A47 Trunk Road (Castor and Ailsworth Bypass and Slip Roads) Order 1988 SI 1988/1509
A47 Trunk Road (Detrunking at Castor and Ailsworth) Order 1988 SI 1988/1510
A1400 Trunk Road (Woodford Avenue Service Road, Redbridge) (Prescribed Routes) Order 1988 SI 1988/1514
Education (Publication of Proposals for Reduction in Standard Number) Regulations 1988 SI 1988/1515
West Strathclyde Protection Order 1988 SI 1988/1516
Irvine (Pilotage Powers) Order 1988 SI 1988/1517
Fowey Harbour, Par and Charlestown (Application of Pilotage Act 1987) Order 1988 SI 1988/1518
Portsmouth Mile End Quay Harbour Revision Order 1988 SI 1988/1519
Local Government Act 1988 (Defined Activities) (Specified Periods) (Wales) (Amendment) Regulations 1988 SI 1988/1520
Act of Sederunt (Rules of the Court of Session Amendment No.4) (Commercial Actions) 1988 SI 1988/1521
Motor Vehicles (Type Approval) (Great Britain) (Amendment) Regulations 1988 SI 1988/1522
Motor Vehicles (Type Approval for Goods Vehicles) (Great Britain) (Amendment) Regulations 1988 SI 1988/1523
Road Vehicles (Construction and Use) (Amendment) (No. 6) Regulations 1988 SI 1988/1524
A406 London North Circular Trunk Road (Popes Lane (B4491) to Western Avenue (A40) Improvement, Trunk Road) Order 1988 SI 1988/1525
A406 London North Circular Trunk Road (Popes Lane (B4491) to Western Avenue (A40) Improvement, Detrunking) Order 1988 SI 1988/1526
 The Uttlesford (Parishes) Order 1988 S.I. 1988/1528
Local Government (Prescribed Expenditure) (Amendment) (No. 2) Regulations 1988 SI 1988/1534
A3 Trunk Road (Roehampton Vale, Wandsworth) (Prescribed Routes) Order 1988 SI 1988/1535
Community Water Charges (Scotland) Regulations 1988 SI 1988/1538
Community Charges (Registration) (Scotland) (No.2) Regulations 1988 SI 1988/1539
Standard and Collective Community Charges (Scotland) Amendment Regulations 1988 SI 1988/1540
Personal Community Charge (Exemption for the Severely Mentally Impaired) (Scotland) Regulations 1988 SI 1988/1541
London Government Reorganisation (Staff Compensation) Order 1988 SI 1988/1542
Social Security (Credits) Amendment (No. 4) Regulations 1988 SI 1988/1545
Public Health (Infectious Diseases) Regulations 1988 SI 1988/1546
Merchant Shipping (Medical Stores) (Fishing Vessels) Regulations 1988 SI 1988/1547
(A16) Norman Cross—Grimsby Trunk Road (Louth Bypass) Order 1988 SI 1988/1548
(A16) Norman Cross—Grimsby Trunk Road (Louth Bypass) (Detrunking) Order 1988 SI 1988/1549
Public Health (Notification of Infectious Diseases) (Scotland) Regulations 1988 SI 1988/1550
Leeds Development Corporation (Planning Functions) Order 1988 SI 1988/1551
Central Manchester Development Corporation (Planning Functions) Order 1988 SI 1988/1552
Sheffield Development Corporation (Planning Functions) Order 1988 SI 1988/1553
Submarine Pipe-lines (Designated Owners) (No. 20) Order 1988 SI 1988/1554
Submarine Pipe-lines (Designated Owners) (No. 21) Order 1988 SI 1988/1555
Submarine Pipe-lines (Designated Owners) (No. 22) Order 1988 SI 1988/1556
Submarine Pipe-lines (Designated Owners) (No. 23) Order 1988 SI 1988/1557
Submarine Pipe-lines (Designated Owners) (No. 24) Order 1988 SI 1988/1558
Submarine Pipe-lines (Designated Owners) (No. 25) Order 1988 SI 1988/1559
Submarine Pipe-lines (Designated Owners) (No. 26) Order 1988 SI 1988/1560
Submarine Pipe-lines (Designated Owners) (No. 27) Order 1988 SI 1988/1561
Transfrontier Shipment of Hazardous Waste Regulations 1988 SI 1988/1562
Block Grant (Education Adjustments) (England) (Amendment) Regulations 1988 SI 1988/1563
Criminal Justice Act 1987 (Commencement No. 3) Order 1988 SI 1988/1564
Agricultural or Forestry Tractors and Tractor Components (Type Approval) Regulations 1988 SI 1988/1567
 The Sedgemoor (Parishes) Order 1988 S.I. 1988/1572
London—Fishguard Trunk Road (A48) (Cross Hands Industrial Site Interchange, Slip Roads Trunking) Order 1988 SI 1988/1583
Electro-medical Equipment (EEC Requirements) Regulations 1988 SI 1988/1586
Energy Act 1983 (Commencement No. 2) Order 1988 SI 1988/1587
Tyne and Wear Residuary Body (Winding Up) Order 1988 SI 1988/1590
Anglian Water Authority (Cringle Brook) Water Order 1988 SI 1988/1591
Hartlepools Water (Leechmire Borehole) Order 1988 SI 1988/1592
London—Penzance Trunk Road A303 (Mere—Wincanton Improvement and Slip Road) Order 1988 SI 1988/1593
London—Penzance Trunk Road A303 (Mere—Wincanton Improvement) (Detrunking) Order 1988 SI 1988/1594
A523 Derby—Macclesfield—South of Stockport Trunk Road (Macclesfield Relief Road) No. 2 Order 1988 SI 1988/1596
A523 Derby—Macclesfield—South of Stockport Trunk Road (Macclesfield Relief Road) (Detrunking) Order 1988 SI 1988/1597
Consumer Arbitration Agreements Act 1988 (Appointed Day No. 1) Order 1988 SI 1988/1598

1601-1700
Gaming Machine Licence Duty Regulations 1988 SI 1988/1602
Treasury Bills (Amendment) Regulations 1988 SI 1988/1603
Smoke Control Areas (Authorised Fuels) Regulations 1988 SI 1988/1607
Community Charges (Registration) (Scotland) (No.2) Amendment Regulations 1988 SI 1988/1611
Tyne and Wear Residuary Body (Winding Up) (Amendment) Order 1988 SI 1988/1615
Teachers' Superannuation (Scotland) Amendment Regulations 1988 SI 1988/1618
Estate Duty (Interest on Unpaid Duty) (No. 2) Order 1988 SI 1988/1619
Estate Duty (Northern Ireland) (Interest on Unpaid Duty) (No. 2) Order 1988 SI 1988/1620
Income Tax (Interest on Unpaid Tax and Repayment Supplement) (No. 3) Order 1988 SI 1988/1621
Income Tax (Official Rate of Interest on Beneficial Loans) (No. 3) Order 1988 SI 1988/1622
Inheritance Tax and Capital Transfer Tax (Interest on Unpaid Tax) (No. 2) Order 1988 SI 1988/1623
Stamp Duty Reserve Tax (Interest on Tax Repaid) (No. 3) Order 1988 SI 1988/1624
County Council of the Royal County of Berkshire (Blakes Bridge Reconstruction Reading) Scheme 1987 Confirmation Instrument 1988 SI 1988/1625
Port of London (Pilotage) Harbour Revision Order 1988 SI 1988/1626
Portsmouth (Pilotage) Harbour Revision Order 1988 SI 1988/1627
Silloth (Pilotage) Harbour Revision Order 1988 SI 1988/1628
Workington (Pilotage) Harbour Revision Order 1988 SI 1988/1629
Beverages of an Alcoholic Strength not exceeding 5.5 per cent. (Provisions) (Appointed Day) Order 1988 SI 1988/1634
Crown Court (Amendment) (No. 3) Rules 1988 SI 1988/1635
Merchant Shipping (Guarding of Machinery and Safety of Electrical Equipment) Regulations 1988 SI 1988/1636
Merchant Shipping (Means of Access) Regulations 1988 SI 1988/1637
Merchant Shipping (Entry into Dangerous Spaces) Regulations 1988 SI 1988/1638
Merchant Shipping (Hatches and Lifting Plant) Regulations 1988 SI 1988/1639
Motorcycles (Sound Level Measurement Certificates) (Amendment) Regulations 1988 SI 1988/1640
Merchant Shipping (Safe Movement on Board Ship) Regulations 1988 SI 1988/1641
Environmentally Sensitive Areas (Breckland and Suffolk River Valleys) Designation (Amendment) Order 1988 SI 1988/1645
Assured Tenancies (Approved Bodies) (No. 3) Order 1988 SI 1988/1646
Ceramic Ware (Safety) Regulations 1988 SI 1988/1647
Wireless Telegraphy (Cordless Telephone Apparatus) (Exemption) Regulations 1988 SI 1988/1648
Teachers' Superannuation (Consolidation) Regulations 1988 SI 1988/1652
Lyon Court and Office Fees (Variation) Order 1988 SI 1988/1653
Transfer of Offenders (Designation of Equivalent Sentences) (Amendment) Order 1988 SI 1988/1654
Docks Regulations 1988 SI 1988/1655
Loading and Unloading of Fishing Vessels Regulations 1988 SI 1988/1656
Control of Substances Hazardous to Health Regulations 1988 SI 1988/1657
London-Fishguard Trunk Road (Haverfordwest Eastern By-pass) Order 1988 SI 1988/1664
Petty Sessional Divisions (Oxfordshire) Order 1988 SI 1988/1665
Northern Ireland (Share of United Kingdom Taxes) (Amendment) Regulations 1988 SI 1988/1667
Welsh Water Authority (Fixed Engine) Order 1988 SI 1988/1668
Motor Vehicles (Type Approval) (Amendment) (No. 2) Regulations 1988 SI 1988/1669
Licensing (Retail Sales) Act 1988 (Commencement) Order 1988 SI 1988/1670
Registered Establishments (Fees) (Scotland) Order 1988 SI 1988/1671
Registration of Establishments (Appeal Tribunal) (Scotland) Amendment Rules 1988 SI 1988/1672
Registration of Establishments (Application Form) (Scotland) Order 1988 SI 1988/1673
Social Security (Unemployment, Sickness and Invalidity Benefit) Amendment (No. 2) Regulations 1988 SI 1988/1674
Food Protection (Emergency Prohibitions) Amendment No.3 Order 1988 SI 1988/1675
Criminal Justice Act 1988 (Commencement No. 2) Order 1988 SI 1988/1676
Mostyn Docks Harbour Empowerment Order 1988 SI 1988/1677
Export of Sheep (Prohibition) (No. 2) Amendment No. 3 Order 1988 SI 1988/1678
Food Protection (Emergency Prohibitions) (England) Amendment No. 4 Order 1988 SI 1988/1679
Food Protection (Emergency Prohibitions) (Wales) (No. 5) Amendment No. 4 Order 1988 SI 1988/1680
Protected Tenancies (Exceptions) (Amendment) Regulations 1988 SI 1988/1683
Alcoholic Liquor Duties (Beer-based Beverages) Order 1988 SI 1988/1684
A106 Trunk Road (Church Lane, Waltham Forest) (Restriction of Use of Gap in Central Reservation) Order 1988 SI 1988/1685
Criminal Justice Act 1987 (Notice of Transfer) Regulations 1988 SI 1988/1691
District of South Somerset (Electoral Arrangements) Order 1988 SI 1988/1692
Merchant Shipping (Stability of Passenger Ships) Regulations 1988 SI 1988/1693
Criminal Justice Act 1987 (Dismissal of Transferred Charges) Rules 1988 SI 1988/1695
Petty Sessions Areas (Divisions and Names) Regulations 1988 SI 1988/1698
Criminal Justice Act 1987 (Preparatory Hearings) Rules 1988 SI 1988/1699
Criminal Justice Act 1987 (Preparatory Hearings) (Interlocutory Appeals) Rules 1988 SI 1988/1700

1701-1800
Magistrates' Courts (Notices of Transfer) Rules 1988 SI 1988/1701
Bideford (Pilotage) Harbour Revision Order 1988 SI 1988/1702
Cattewater (Pilotage) Harbour Revision Order 1988 SI 1988/1703
Lowestoft (Pilotage) Harbour Revision Order 1988 SI 1988/1704
Port of Wisbech (Pilotage) Harbour Revision Order 1988 SI 1988/1706
Weymouth and Portland (Pilotage) Harbour Revision Order 1988 SI 1988/1707
M66 Motorway (Manchester Outer Ring Road, Denton to Middleton Section) and Connecting Roads Scheme 1988 SI 1988/1708
Criminal Justice (Scotland) Act 1987 (Commencement No. 6) Order 1988 SI 1988/1710
Caernarfon (Pilotage) Harbour Revision Order 1988 SI 1988/1711
Central Institutions (Scotland) Regulations 1988 SI 1988/1715
Merchant Shipping (Operations Book) Regulations 1988 SI 1988/1716
Petty Sessional Divisions (Kent) Order 1988 SI 1988/1717
Home Purchase Assistance (Recognised Lending Institutions) (No. 2) Order 1988 SI 1988/1723
Social Fund Cold Weather Payments (General) Regulations 1988 SI 1988/1724
Social Security (Common Provisions) Miscellaneous Amendment Regulations 1988 SI 1988/1725
Housing (Right to Buy) (Priority of Charges) (No. 2) Order 1988 SI 1988/1726
Mortgage Indemnities (Recognised Bodies) (No. 2) Order 1988 SI 1988/1727
M66 Motorway (Middleton to the Lancashire/Yorkshire Motorway (M62) Section) and Connecting Roads Scheme 1988 SI 1988/1728
Mines (Safety of Exit) Regulations 1988 SI 1988/1729
River Tummel Catchment Area Protection (Renewal) Order 1988 SI 1988/1733
River Lunan Catchment Area Protection (Renewal) Order 1988 SI 1988/1734
Self-Propelled Industrial Trucks (EEC Requirements) Regulations 1988 SI 1988/1736
Borough of Blyth Valley (Electoral Arrangements) Order 1988 SI 1988/1737
Indictments (Procedure) (Amendment) Rules 1988 SI 1988/1738
Insolvency (Amendment) Regulations 1988 SI 1988/1739
Submarine Pipe-lines (Designated Owners) (No. 28) Order 1988 SI 1988/1740
Submarine Pipe-lines (Designated Owners) (No. 29) Order 1988 SI 1988/1741
Submarine Pipe-lines (Designated Owners) (No. 30) Order 1988 SI 1988/1742
Submarine Pipe-lines (Designated Owners) (No. 31) Order 1988 SI 1988/1743
Submarine Pipe-lines (Designated Owners) (No. 32) Order 1988 SI 1988/1744
Local Government Reorganisation (Property) (No.2) (West Yorkshire) Order 1988 SI 1988/1745
Employment Protection (Medical Suspension) Order 1988 SI 1988/1746
London Government Reorganisation (Mortgages) Order 1988 SI 1988/1747
Rickmansworth Water Company (Repeal of Local Enactments) Order 1988 SI 1988/1758
Seed Potatoes (Amendment) Regulations 1988 SI 1988/1759
Spirits (Rectifying, Compounding and Drawback) Regulations 1988 SI 1988/1760
Cod (Specified Sea Areas) (Prohibition of Fishing) (Variation) Order 1988 SI 1988/1761
Police (Complaints) (General) (Amendment) Regulations 1988 SI 1988/1762
Public Telecommunication System Designation (Cotswold Cable Television Company Limited) Order 1988 SI 1988/1763
A13 Trunk Road (New Road, Havering) (Prescribed Routes) Order 1988 SI 1988/1766
Trade Descriptions (Place of Production) (Marking) Order 1988 SI 1988/1771
Foreign Prison-made Goods Act 1897 (Amendment) Regulations 1988 SI 1988/1772
A11 Trunk Road (High Road, Leytonstone, Waltham Forest) (Prescribed Routes) Order 1988 SI 1988/1773
Housing and Planning Act 1986 (Commencement No. 12) Order 1988 SI 1988/1787
Fees for Inquiries (Standard Daily Amount) Regulations 1988 SI 1988/1788
Local Government (Council of the Borough of Newport, Gwent, Library Authority) Order 1988 SI 1988/1789
Control of Pollution (Special Waste) (Amendment) Regulations 1988 SI 1988/1790
Education Reform Act 1988 (Commencement No.2) Order 1988 SI 1988/1794
 The Medina (Parish of Seaview) Order 1988 S.I. 1988/1795
Nurses, Midwives and Health Visitors (Entry to Training Requirements) Amendment Rules Approval Order 1988 SI 1988/1798
Education (Higher Education Corporations) Order 1988 SI 1988/1799
Education (Higher Education Corporations) (No. 2) Order 1988 SI 1988/1800

1801-1900
Education (Higher Education Corporations) (No.3) Order 1988 SI 1988/1801
Importation of Milk Regulations 1988 SI 1988/1803
Milk and Dairies (Semi-skimmed and Skimmed Milk) (Heat Treatment and Labelling) (Amendment) Regulations 1988 SI 1988/1804
Milk (Special Designation) (Amendment) Regulations 1988 SI 1988/1805
Fire Safety and Safety of Places of Sport Act 1987 (Commencement No. 4) Order 1988 SI 1988/1806
Safety of Places of Sport Regulations 1988 SI 1988/1807
Goods Vehicles (Authorisation of International Journeys) (Fees) (Amendment) Regulations 1988 SI 1988/1808
Road Transport (International Passenger Services) (Amendment) Regulations 1988 SI 1988/1809
Customs and Excise (Deferred Payment) (RAF Airfields and Offshore Installations) Regulations 1988 SI 1988/1810
Goods Vehicles (Operators' Licences) (Temporary Use in Great Britain) (Amendment) Regulations 1988 SI 1988/1811
Town and Country Planning (Applications) Regulations 1988 SI 1988/1812
Town and Country Planning General Development Order 1988 SI 1988/1813
Importation of Milk (Scotland) Regulations 1988 SI 1988/1814
Milk and Dairies (Semi-skimmed and Skimmed Milk) (Heat Treatment and Labelling) (Scotland) Amendment Regulations 1988 SI 1988/1815
Milk (Special Designations) (Scotland) Amendment Order 1988 SI 1988/1816
Criminal Justice Act 1988 (Commencement No.3) Order 1988 SI 1988/1817
Debtors (Scotland) Act 1987 (Commencement No.2) Order 1988 SI 1988/1818
Law Reform (Miscellaneous Provisions) (Scotland) Act 1985 (Commencement No.4) Order 1988 SI 1988/1819
Police Cadets (Amendment) (No. 2) Regulations 1988 SI 1988/1820
Police (Amendment) (No. 2) Regulations 1988 SI 1988/1821
European Parliamentary Elections (Day of Election) Order 1988 SI 1988/1822
European Parliamentary Elections (Day of By-election) (Hampshire Central Constituency) Order 1988 SI 1988/1823
Patents, Designs and Marks Act 1986 (Commencement No. 2) Order 1988 SI 1988/1824
Land Registration (District Registries) Order 1988 SI 1988/1825
(A650) North-West of Doncaster—Kendal Trunk Road (Drighlington Bypass) Order 1988 SI 1988/1826
(A650) North-West of Doncaster—Kendal Trunk Road (Bradford District Boundary to Gildersome Interchange De-Trunking) Order 1988 SI 1988/1827
London—Great Yarmouth Trunk Road (A12) (Cambridge Park Detrunking) Order 1988 SI 1988/1828
London—Great Yarmouth Trunk Road (A12) (Eastway to Eastern Avenue and Slip Roads at Wanstead) Variation Order 1988 SI 1988/1829
London—Great Yarmouth Trunk Road (A12) (Eastway to Eastern Avenue Section) (Green Man Interchange Slip Roads) Order 1988 SI 1988/1830
London—Great Yarmouth Trunk Road (A12) (Eastway to Eastern Avenue Section) (Lea Interchange Slip Roads) Order 1988 SI 1988/1831
London—Great Yarmouth Trunk Road (A106) Detrunking Order 1988 SI 1988/1832
London—Norwich Trunk Road (A11) (Leytonstone Road and High Road Leytonstone Detrunking) Order 1988 SI 1988/1833
A102(M) Motorway (Eastway Section) No. 2 Scheme 1988 SI 1988/1834
A102(M) Motorway (Eastway Section) Connecting Roads Scheme 1988 SI 1988/1835
Transfer of Functions (British Museum (Natural History)) Order 1988 SI 1988/1836
Local Authorities (Armorial Bearings) Order 1988 SI 1988/1837
Bermuda (Territorial Sea) Order in Council 1988 SI 1988/1838
Child Abduction and Custody (Parties to Conventions) (Amendment) (No. 3) Order 1988 SI 1988/1839
Merchant Shipping (Prevention of Oil Pollution) (Hong Kong) (Amendment) Order 1988 SI 1988/1840
Merchant Shipping Act 1988 (Cayman Islands) Order 1988 SI 1988/1841
St. Helena Constitution Order 1988 SI 1988/1842
Transfer of Functions (Health and Social Security) Order 1988 SI 1988/1843
Corneal Tissue (Northern Ireland) Order 1988 SI 1988/1844
Criminal Justice (Firearms) (Northern Ireland) Order 1988 SI 1988/1845
Criminal Justice (Serious Fraud) (Northern Ireland) Order 1988 SI 1988/1846
Criminal Justice (Evidence, Etc.) (Northern Ireland) Order 1988 SI 1988/1847
Fuel and Electricity (Control) Act 1973 (Continuation) (Jersey) Order 1988 SI 1988/1848
Malicious Communications (Northern Ireland) Order 1988 SI 1988/1849
Merchant Shipping Act 1965 (Guernsey) Order 1988 SI 1988/1850
Merchant Shipping Act 1979 (Guernsey) Order 1988 SI 1988/1851
Scotch Whisky (Northern Ireland) Order 1988 SI 1988/1852
Reciprocal Enforcement of Foreign Judgments (Canada) (Amendment) (No. 2) Order 1988 SI 1988/1853
Registration of Title (No. 2) Order 1988 SI 1988/1854
Copyright (International Conventions) (Amendment No. 3) Order 1988 SI 1988/1855
Patents, Designs and Marks (Guinea-Bissau and Malaysia) (Convention and Relevant Countries) Order 1988 SI 1988/1856
Social Security Act 1988 (Commencement No. 3) Order 1988 SI 1988/1857
Industrial Training Levy (Road Transport) Order 1988 SI 1988/1858
Nursing Homes Registration (Scotland) Regulations 1988 SI 1988/1861
Crown Prosecution Service (Witnesses' etc. Allowances) Regulations 1988 SI 1988/1862
Serious Fraud Office (Witnesses' etc. Allowances) Regulations 1988 SI 1988/1863
Exeter — Launceston — Bodmin Trunk Road A30 (Plusha to Bolventor Improvement) (Detrunking) Order 1988 SI 1988/1867
Exeter—Launceston—Bodmin Trunk Road A30 (Plusha to Bolventor Improvement and Slip Roads) Order 1988 SI 1988/1869
Road Vehicles (Construction and Use) (Amendment) (No. 7) Regulations 1988 SI 1988/1871
 The Cannock Chase District Order 1987 (Variation of Supplementary Provision) 1988 S.I. 1988/1872
Renfrew and Cunninghame Districts (Whitehouse) Boundaries Amendment Order 1988 SI 1988/1877 (S. 173)
Three Valleys Water Order 1988 SI 1988/1878
Public Service Vehicles (Registration of Local Services) (Amendment) Regulations 1988 SI 1988/1879
Community Charges (Levying, Collection and Payment) (Scotland) Regulations 1988 SI 1988/1880
Food Protection (Emergency Prohibitions) Amendment No. 4 Order 1988 SI 1988/1881
Import and Export (Plant Health Fees) (Scotland) Order 1988 SI 1988/1882
Family Law (Scotland) Act 1985 (Commencement No.2) Order 1988 SI 1988/1887
Education (Higher Education Corporations) (Amendment) Order 1988 SI 1988/1888
Community Charges (Information Concerning Social Security) (Scotland) Regulations 1988 SI 1988/1889
Housing Benefit (Community Charge Rebates) (Scotland) Regulations 1988 SI 1988/1890
Civil Legal Aid (Scotland) Amendment (No.3) Regulations 1988 SI 1988/1891
Court of Session Etc. Fees Amendment (No.3) Order 1988 SI 1988/1892
Sheriff Court Fees Amendment (No.2) Order 1988 SI 1988/1893
Motor Vehicles (Tests) (Amendment) (No. 3) Regulations 1988 SI 1988/1894
Customs and Excise (Deferred Payment) (RAF Airfields and Offshore Installations) (No. 2) Regulations 1988 SI 1988/1898
Merchant Shipping (Protection of Shipping and Trading Interests) (USSR) (Revocation) Order 1988 SI 1988/1899
Submarine Pipe-lines (Designated Owners) (No. 33) Order 1988 SI 1988/1900

1901-2000
Submarine Pipe-lines (Designated Owners) (No. 34) Order 1988 SI 1988/1901
Submarine Pipe-lines (Designated Orders) (No.35) Order 1988 SI 1988/1902
Submarine Pipe-lines (Designated Owners) (No. 36) Order 1988 SI 1988/1903
Non-Domestic Rates (Scotland) Regulations 1988 SI 1988/1904
Training Commission (Incidental and Transitional Provisions) Order 1988 SI 1988/1905
Penalty Points (Alteration) Order 1988 SI 1988/1906
Merchant Shipping Act 1988 (Commencement No. 2) Order 1988 SI 1988/1907
Social Fund Cold Weather Payments (General) Amendment Regulations 1988 SI 1988/1908
Merchant Shipping (Fishing Vessels—Tonnage) Regulations 1988 SI 1988/1909
Merchant Shipping (Tonnage) (Amendment) Regulations 1988 SI 1988/1910
Merchant Shipping (Transitional Provisions — Fishing Vessels) Order 1988 SI 1988/1911
Petty Sessional Divisions (Warwickshire) Order 1988 SI 1988/1912
Rivers Tweed and Eye Protection (Renewal) Order 1988 SI 1988/1913
Merchant Shipping (Registration of Fishing Vessels) Regulations 1988 SI 1988/1926
Sutton Harbour Revision Order 1988 SI 1988/1928
Merchant Shipping (Fees) (Amendment) Regulations 1988 SI 1988/1929
Quarries (Explosives) Regulations 1988 SI 1988/1930
Scottish Land Court (Fees) Amendment Rules 1988 SI 1988/1933
National Health Service (Payments for Optical Appliances) Amendment (No. 4) Regulations 1988 SI 1988/1935
Police Pensions (Lump Sum Payments to Widows) Regulations 1988 SI 1988/1936
Royal Irish Constabulary (Lump Sum Payments to Widows) Regulations 1988 SI 1988/1937
Legal Aid (General) (Amendment) (No. 2) Regulations 1988 SI 1988/1938
Southampton (Pilotage) Harbour Revision Order 1988 SI 1988/1940
Port of Heysham (Pilotage) Harbour Revision Order 1988 SI 1988/1946
Falmouth (Pilotage) Harbour Revision Order 1988 SI 1988/1947
Wireless Telegraphy Apparatus (Approval) (Test Fees) Order 1988 SI 1988/1949
National Health Service (Payments for Optical Appliances) (Scotland) Amendment (No.4) SI 1988/1950
Rate Support Grant (Specified Bodies) Regulations 1988 SI 1988/1951
Local Government Reorganisation (Miscellaneous Provision) Order 1988 SI 1988/1955
National Health Service (Superannuation) (Scotland) Amendment Regulations 1988 SI 1988/1956
Friendly Societies (Valuation) (Amendment) Regulations 1988 SI 1988/1959
Financial Services Act 1986 (Commencement) (No. 10) Order 1988 SI 1988/1960
Financial Services (Schemes Authorised in Designated Countries or Territories) (Notification) Regulations 1988 SI 1988/1961
Income Tax (Interest Relief) (Qualifying Lenders) (No. 2) Order 1988 SI 1988/1962
Local Government (Non-Domestic District Rates and District Community Charges) (Scotland) Regulations 1988 SI 1988/1963
Insurance Brokers Registration Council (Registration and Enrolment) (Amendment) Rules Approval Order 1988 SI 1988/1964
Merger Reference (Elders IXL Limited and Scottish & Newcastle Breweries plc) Order 1988 SI 1988/1965
County of Gwent (Electoral Arrangements) Order 1988 SI 1988/1966
Liverpool and Wirral Urban Development Area Order 1988 SI 1988/1967
Merseyside Development Corporation (Planning Functions) (Liverpool and Wirral) Order 1988 SI 1988/1968
Data Protection (Fees) Regulations 1988 SI 1988/1969
Family Credit (General) Amendment No. 4 Regulations 1988 SI 1988/1970
Housing Benefit (General) Amendment No. 4 Regulations 1988 SI 1988/1971
A40 Trunk Road (Western Avenue, Ealing) (Prohibition of Left Turn) Order 1988 SI 1988/1972
Mersey Docks and Harbour Revision (No. 2) Order 1988 SI 1988/1973
Safety of Sports Grounds (Designation) Order 1988 SI 1988/1975
Act of Sederunt (Small Claim Rules) 1988 SI 1988/1976
Non-Domestic District Rates (Timetable) (Scotland) Regulations 1988 SI 1988/1977
Act of Sederunt (Amendment of Sheriff Court Ordinary Cause, and Summary Cause, Rules) 1988 SI 1988/1978
Legal Officers (Annual Fees) Order 1988 SI 1988/1979
Patronage (Appeals) Rules 1988 SI 1988/1980
Education (Grant-maintained Schools) (Termination of Power to Determine a Period of Suspension) Order 1988 SI 1988/1981
Agriculture Improvement (Amendment) (No. 2) Regulations 1988 SI 1988/1982
Agriculture Improvement (Variation) (No. 2) Scheme 1988 SI 1988/1983
Transfer of Functions (Government Shareholding in British Airways Plc) Order 1988 SI 1988/1984
Parliamentary Commissioner (No. 2) Order 1988 SI 1988/1985
Consular Fees (Amendment) (No. 2) Order 1988 SI 1988/1986
Criminal Evidence (Northern Ireland) Order 1988 SI 1988/1987
Education (Academic Tenure) (Northern Ireland) Order 1988 SI 1988/1988
Education (Unrecognised Degrees) (Northern Ireland) Order 1988 SI 1988/1989
Housing (Northern Ireland) Order 1988 SI 1988/1990
Merchant Shipping (Certification of Deck Officers and Marine Engineer Officers) (Guernsey) Order 1988 SI 1988/1991
Parliamentary Constituencies (Scotland) (Miscellaneous Changes) Order 1988 SI 1988/1992
Sheriff Courts (Scotland) Act 1971 (Privative Jurisdiction and Summary Cause) Order 1988 SI 1988/1993
Air Navigation (Aeroplane and Aeroplane Engine Emission of Unburned Hydrocarbons) Order 1988 SI 1988/1994
Payments to Redundant Churches Fund Order 1988 SI 1988/1995
Benefices (Institution Appeals) Rules 1988 SI 1988/1996
Small Claims (Scotland) Order 1988 SI 1988/1999
Noise Insulation (Amendment) Regulations 1988 SI 1988/2000

2001-2100
Merchant Shipping (Ships' Names) (Amendment) Regulations 1988 SI 1988/2001
Education Reform Act 1988 (Commencement No. 3) Order 1988 SI 1988/2002
Merchant Shipping (Fishing Vessels' Names) Regulations 1988 SI 1988/2003
Petty Sessional Divisions (Berkshire) Order 1988 SI 1988/2008
Act of Sederunt (Proceedings in the Sheriff Court under the Debtors (Scotland) Act 1987) 1988 SI 1988/2013
Advice and Assistance (Scotland) (Prospective Cost) (No.2) Regulations 1988 SI 1988/2014
Financial Services (Designated Countries and Territories) (Overseas Collective Investment Schemes) Order 1988 SI 1988/2015
Medicines (Products Other Than Veterinary Drugs) (Prescription Only) Amendment Order 1988 SI 1988/2017
Assured Tenancies (Approved Bodies) (No. 4) Order 1988 SI 1988/2018
Criminal Justice Act 1988 (Offensive Weapons) Order 1988 SI 1988/2019
Income Support (General) Amendment No. 5 Regulations 1988 SI 1988/2022
Conservation of Seals (Common Seals) Order 1988 SI 1988/2023
Conservation of Seals (England and Wales) Order 1988 SI 1988/2024
Education (Listed Bodies) Order 1988 SI 1988/2034
Education (Recognised Awards) Order 1988 SI 1988/2035
Education (Recognised Bodies) Order 1988 SI 1988/2036
Education Support Grants (Amendment) (No. 2) Regulations 1988 SI 1988/2037
Housing (Scotland) Act 1988 Commencement Order 1988 SI 1988/2038
Weights and Measures (Intoxicating Liquor) Order 1988 SI 1988/2039
Weights and Measures (Miscellaneous Foods) Order 1988Approved by both Houses of ParliamentJ SI 1988/2040
Consumer Protection Act 1987 (Commencement No. 2) Order 1988 SI 1988/2041
Employment Act 1988 (Commencement No. 2) Order 1988 SI 1988/2042
Passenger and Goods Vehicles (Recording Equipment) (Approval of Fitters and Workshops) (Fees) (Amendment) Regulations 1988 SI 1988/2043
North Devon Link Road (Little Gornhay Junction Slip Roads) (Trunking) Order 1988 SI 1988/2044
A1079 Trunk Road (Hull City Boundary to Barmston Drain) (De-Trunking) Order 1988 SI 1988/2045
Shoreham Port Authority Harbour Revision Order 1988 SI 1988/2046
Consumer Credit (Agreements and Cancellation Notices and Copies of Documents) (Amendment) Regulations 1988 SI 1988/2047
Distress for Rent Rules 1988 SI 1988/2050
Customs Duties (ECSC) (Amendment No. 3) Order 1988 SI 1988/2055
Housing Act 1988 (Commencement No. 1) Order 1988 SI 1988/2056
Housing (Right to Buy) (Designated Rural Areas and Designated Region) (England) Order 1988 SI 1988/2057
Merger Reference (Strong & Fisher (Holdings) plc and Pittard Garnar plc) Order 1988 SI 1988/2058
Act of Sederunt (Form of charge for payment) 1988 SI 1988/2059
Act of Sederunt (Rules of the Court of Session Amendment No.5) (Time to pay directions) 1988 SI 1988/2060
Merchant Shipping (Seamen's Wages and Accounts) (Fishing Vessels) (Amendment) Regulations 1988 SI 1988/2064
Agriculture Improvement (Amendment) (No. 3) Regulations 1988 SI 1988/2065
Agriculture Improvement (Variation) (No. 3) Scheme 1988 SI 1988/2066
Assured Tenancies (Notices to Quit Prescribed Information) (Scotland) Regulations 1988 SI 1988/2067
Assured Tenancies (Exceptions) (Scotland) Regulations 1988 SI 1988/2068
Assured Tenancies (Tenancies at a Low Rent) (Scotland) Order 1988 SI 1988/2069
Public Lending Right Scheme 1982 (Commencement of Variations) Order 1988 SI 1988/2070
Cod (Specified Sea Areas) (Prohibition of Fishing) (Revocation) Order 1988 SI 1988/2071
Employment Appeal Tribunal (Amendment) Rules 1988 SI 1988/2072
Criminal Justice Act 1988 (Commencement No.4) Order 1988 SI 1988/2073
Education (Amendment of the Teachers' Pay and Conditions Act 1987) Order 1988 SI 1988/2074
Consumer Protection Act 1987 (Commencement No. 3) Order 1988 SI 1988/2076
Registration of Births, Deaths and Marriages (Fees) (No. 2) Order 1988 SI 1988/2077
Consumer Protection (Code of Practice for Traders on Price Indications) Approval Order 1988 SI 1988/2078
Price Marking (Bargain Offers) (Revocation) Order 1988 SI 1988/2079
Housing Revenue Account General Fund Contribution Limits (Scotland) Order 1988 SI 1988/2081
Car Tax (Amendment) Regulations 1988 SI 1988/2082
Value Added Tax (General) (Amendment) Regulations 1988 SI 1988/2083
Sweeteners in Food (Scotland) Amendment Regulations 1988 SI 1988/2084
Assured Tenancies (Rent Book) (Scotland) Regulations 1988 SI 1988/2085
Landlord's Repairing Obligations (Specified Rent) (Scotland) Order 1988 SI 1988/2086
Designs (Amendment) Rules 1988 SI 1988/2088
Patents (Amendment) Rules 1988 SI 1988/2089
Wireless Telegraphy (Reciprocal Exemption of European Radio Amateurs) Regulations 1988 SI 1988/2090
Town and Country Planning General Development (Amendment) Order 1988 SI 1988/2091
Acquisition of Land (Rate of Interest after Entry) (No. 2) Regulations 1988 SI 1988/2092
Acquisition of Land (Rate of Interest after Entry) (Scotland) (No. 2) Regulations 1988 SI 1988/2093
Opencast Coal (Rate of Interest on Compensation) (No. 2) Order 1988 SI 1988/2094
Act of Sederunt (Messengers-at-Arms and Sheriff Officers Rules) 1988 SI 1988/2097
Veterinary Surgeons and Veterinary Practitioners (Registration)(Amendment) Regulations Order of Council 1988 SI 1988/2099
 The Melton (Parishes) Order 1988 S.I. 1988/2100

2101-2200
Lands Tribunal for Scotland (Amendment) (Fees) Rules 1988 SI 1988/2105
Local Statutory Provisions (Postponement of Repeal) (Scotland) Order 1988 SI 1988/2106
Health and Medicines Act 1988 (Commencement No. 1) Order 1988 SI 1988/2107
Value Added Tax (General) (Amendment) (No. 2) Regulations 1988 SI 1988/2108
Assured Tenancies (Forms) (Scotland) Regulations 1988 SI 1988/2109
Butter (EEC Special Sale) (Revocation) SI 1988/2110
Spring Traps Approval (Variation) Order 1988 SI 1988/2111
Sweeteners in Food (Amendment) Regulations 1988 SI 1988/2112
Medicines (Pharmacies) (Applications for Registration and Fees) Amendment Regulations 1988 SI 1988/2113
Local Government Reorganisation (Property, etc.) (Greater Manchester) Order 1988 SI 1988/2114
Birmingham—Great Yarmouth Trunk Road (A47) (Eye Bypass) Order 1988 SI 1988/2115
Funds for Trade Union Ballots (Amendment No. 2) Regulations 1988 SI 1988/2116
Trade Union Ballots and Elections (Independent Scrutineer Qualifications) Order 1988 SI 1988/2117
Occupational Pensions (Revaluation) Order 1988 SI 1988/2118
Social Security (Unemployment, Sickness and Invalidity Benefit) Amendment (No. 3) Regulations 1988 SI 1988/2119
Weighing Equipment (Non-automatic Weighing Machines) (Amendment) Regulations 1988 SI 1988/2120
Cosmetic Products (Safety) (Amendment No.2) Regulations 1988 SI 1988/2121
Three-Wheeled All-Terrain Motor Vehicles (Safety)Regulations 1988 SI 1988/2122
Mersey Docks and Harbour (Princes River Berth) Revision Order 1988 SI 1988/2124
(A43) Oxford—Market Deeping Trunk Road (Blisworth and Milton Malsor Bypass and Slip Roads to Rothersthorpe Service Area) Order 1988 SI 1988/2125
(A43) Oxford—Market Deeping Trunk Road (Blisworth and Milton Malsor Bypass and Slip Roads to Rothersthorpe Service Area) Detrunking Order 1988 SI 1988/2126
M1 Motorway (Rothersthorpe Service Area Connecting Roads) Scheme 1988 SI 1988/2127
Goods Vehicles (Operators' Licences, Qualifications and Fees) (Amendment) Regulations 1988 SI 1988/2128
Education (NAB Staff) Order 1988 SI 1988/2129
Civil Aviation (Route Charges for Navigation Services) (Fifth Amendment) Regulations 1988 SI 1988/2130
Crown Court (Amendment) (No. 4) Rules 1988 SI 1988/2131
Magistrates' Courts (Criminal Justice Act 1988) (Miscellaneous Amendments) Rules 1988 SI 1988/2132
Air Navigation (Dangerous Goods) (Second Amendment) Regulations 1988 SI 1988/2133
Agricultural Levies (Export Control) Regulations 1988 SI 1988/2135
Medicines (Exemptions from Restrictions on the Retail Sale or Supply of Veterinary Drugs) (Amendment) (No. 2) Order 1988 SI 1988/2136
Protection of Wrecks (Designation No. 2 Order 1984) (Amendment) Order 1988 SI 1988/2137
Protection of Wrecks (Designation No. 1) Order 1988 SI 1988/2138
National Savings Bank (Amendment) (No. 2) Regulations 1988 SI 1988/2144
Income Tax (Reduced and Composite Rate) Order 1988 SI 1988/2145
Rating Lists (Valuation Date) Order 1988 SI 1988/2146
Financial Services (Designated Countries and Territories) (Overseas Collective Investment Schemes) (Guernsey) Order 1988 SI 1988/2148
Financial Services (Designated Countries and Territories) (Overseas Collective Investment Schemes) (Jersey) Order 1988 SI 1988/2149
Civil Aviation (Joint Financing) Regulations 1988 SI 1988/2151
Housing Act 1988 (Commencement No. 2) Order 1988 SI 1988/2152
London Regional Transport Levy (General Rate Act 1967) (Modification) Order 1988 SI 1988/2153
Education (Schools and Further Education) (Amendment) Regulations 1988 SI 1988/2154
Landlord's Repairing Obligations (Specified Rent) (Scotland) (No .2) Order 1988 SI 1988/2155
Isles of Scilly (Pilotage) Harbour Revision Order 1988 SI 1988/2156
Littlehampton (Pilotage) Harbour Revision Order 1988 SI 1988/2157
Wells (Pilotage) Harbour Revision Order 1988 SI 1988/2158
Criminal Appeal (Amendment) Rules 1988 SI 1988/2159
Crown Court (Amendment) (No. 5) Rules 1988 SI 1988/2160
Lotteries (Amendment) Regulations 1988 SI 1988/2161
Police (Amendment) (No. 3) Regulations 1988 SI 1988/2162
Police Cadets (Amendment) (No. 3) Regulations 1988 SI 1988/2163
Civil Courts (Amendment) Order 1988 SI 1988/2165
Act of Sederunt (Fees of Messengers-at-Arms) (No .2) 1988' SI 1988/2166
Act of Sederunt (Fees of Sheriff Officers) (No.2) 1988 SI 1988/2167
School Curriculum Development Committee and Secondary Examinations Council (Designation of Staff) Order 1988 SI 1988/2171
School Curriculum Development Committee and Secondary Examinations Council (Transfer of Property) Order 1988 SI 1988/2172
Valuation Timetable (Scotland) Amendment (No .2) Order 1988 SI 1988/2173
Iron Casting (Scientific Research Levy) (Abolition) Order 1988 SI 1988/2177
Merger Reference (Hillsdown Holdings plc and Pittard Garnar plc) Order 1988 SI 1988/2178
Cumbria and Lancashire (County Boundaries) Order 1988 SI 1988/2179
Cleveland and Durham (County Boundaries) Order 1988 SI 1988/2180
Accommodation of Children (Charge and Control) Regulations 1988 SI 1988/2183
Boarding-out of Children (Foster Placement) Regulations 1988 SI 1988/2184
Income Tax (Interest on Unpaid Tax and Repayment Supplement) (No. 4) Order 1988 SI 1988/2185
Income Tax (Official Rate of Interest on Beneficial Loans) (No. 4) Order 1988 SI 1988/2186
Stamp Duty Reserve Tax (Interest on Tax Repaid) (No.4) Order 1988 SI 1988/2187
Children and Young Persons (Amendment) Act 1986 (Commencement No. 2) Order 1988 SI 1988/2188
Housing (Prescribed Forms) (Repair Notices etc.) Regulations 1988 SI 1988/2189
Milk and Dairies (Semi-skimmed and Skimmed Milk) (Heat Treatment) (Scotland) Regulations 1988 SI 1988/2190
Milk (Special Designations) (Scotland) Order 1988 SI 1988/2191
Housing (Scotland) Act 1988 (Specified Date) Order 1988 SI 1988/2192
Lotteries (Scotland) Amendment Regulations 1988 SI 1988/2193
Building (Procedure) (Scotland) Amendment Regulations 1988 SI 1988/2194
Rent Act 1977 (Forms etc.) (Amendment) Regulations 1988 SI 1988/2195
Cod (Specified Sea Area) (Prohibition of Fishing) Order 1988 SI 1988/2196
Plaice (Specified Sea Areas) (Prohibition of Fishing) Order 1988 SI 1988/2197
Rent Book (Forms of Notice) (Amendment) Regulations 1988 SI 1988/2198
Assured Tenancies and Agricultural Occupancies (Rent Information) Order 1988 SI 1988/2199
Rent Assessment Committees (England and Wales) (Amendment) Regulations 1988 SI 1988/2200

2201-2300
Notices to Quit etc. (Prescribed Information) Regulations 1988 SI 1988/2201
Local Government Reorganisation (Capital Money) (Greater London) (Amendment) Order 1988 SI 1988/2202
Assured Tenancies and Agricultural Occupancies (Forms) Regulations 1988 SI 1988/2203
Milk (Special Designation) Regulations 1988 SI 1988/2204
Milk and Dairies (Semi-skimmed and Skimmed Milk) (Heat Treatment and Labelling) Regulations 1988 SI 1988/2206
 The Windsor and Maidenhead (Parishes) Order 1988 S.I. 1988/2207
Ministry of Defence Police (Defence Police Federation) Regulations 1988 SI 1988/2208
Firearms (Amendment) Act 1988 (Commencement No. 1) Order 1988 SI 1988/2209
Community Charges (Notification of Deaths) (Scotland) Regulations 1988 SI 1988/2211
Value Added Tax (Imported Goods) Relief (Amendment) (No. 2) Order 1988 SI 1988/2212
Spring Traps Approval (Scotland) Variation Order 1988 SI 1988/2213
Registration of Births, Deaths, Marriages and Divorces (Fees) (Scotland) (No.2) Regulations 1988 SI 1988/2214
Marriage Fees (Scotland) Regulations 1988 SI 1988/2215
Statutory Harbour Undertakings (Pilotage Accounts) Regulations 1988 SI 1988/2216
Value Added Tax (Repayment to Community Traders) (Amendment) Regulations 1988 SI 1988/2217
Price Marking (Petrol) (Amendment) Order 1988 SI 1988/2226
Employment Subsidies Act 1978 (Renewal) (Great Britain) Order 1988 SI 1988/2229
Combined Probation Areas (Berkshire) Order 1988 SI 1988/2232
Combined Probation Areas (Oxfordshire) Order 1988 SI 1988/2233
Combined Probation Areas (Warwickshire) Order 1988 SI 1988/2234
Fire Services (Appointments and Promotion) (Amendment) (No. 3) Regulations 1988 SI 1988/2235
Assured and Protected Tenancies (Lettings to Students) Regulations 1988 SI 1988/2236
Personal and Occupational Pension Schemes (Incentive Payments) Amendment Regulations 1988 SI 1988/2237
Personal Pension Schemes (Compensation) Regulations 1988 SI 1988/2238
Clergy Pensions (Amendment) Regulations 1988 SI 1988/2239
European Communities (Designation) (No.2) Order 1988 SI 1988/2240
Architects' Qualifications (EC Recognition) Order 1988 SI 1988/2241
Criminal Justice Act 1988 (Torture) (Overseas Territories) Order 1988 SI 1988/2242
Extradition (Hijacking) (Amendment) Order 1988 SI 1988/2243
Extradition (Internationally Protected Persons) (Amendment) Order 1988 SI 1988/2244
Extradition (Protection of Aircraft) (Amendment) Order 1988 SI 1988/2245
Extradition (Taking of Hostages) (Amendment) Order 1988 SI 1988/2246
Extradition (Torture) Order 1988 SI 1988/2247
Naval, Military and Air Forces etc. (Disablement and Death) Service Pensions Amendment (No. 2) Order 1988 SI 1988/2248
Health and Medicines (Northern Ireland) Order 1988 SI 1988/2249
Air Navigation (Fourth Amendment) Order 1988 SI 1988/2250
Merchant Shipping (Categorisation of Registries of Overseas Territories) Order 1988 SI 1988/2251
Merchant Shipping (Prevention of Pollution by Garbage) Order 1988 SI 1988/2252
Ministerial and other Salaries Order 1988 SI 1988/2253
Trustee Investments (Additional Powers) Order 1988 SI 1988/2254
General Medical Council Preliminary Proceedings Committee and Professional Conduct Committee (Procedure) Rules Order of Council 1988 SI 1988/2255
Church of England Pensions Regulations 1988 SI 1988/2256
Customs Duties (ECSC) (Quota and Other Reliefs) Order 1988 SI 1988/2257
Financial Services (Recognised Collective Investment Schemes from Other Member States) (Luxembourg) Order 1988 SI 1988/2258
National Health Service (General Medical and Pharmaceutical Services) (Scotland) Amendment (No .3) Regulations 1988 SI 1988/2259
Personal Injuries (Civilians) Amendment (No. 2) Scheme 1988 SI 1988/2260
 The Kettering (Parishes) Order 1988 S.I. 1988/2262
Zoonoses Order 1988 SI 1988/2264
National Health Service (General Dental Services) Amendment (No. 2) Regulations 1988 SI 1988/2265
County of Dyfed (Electoral Arrangements) Order 1988 SI 1988/2266
Use of Invalid Carriages on Highways Regulations 1988 SI 1988/2268
Artificial Insemination (Cattle and Pigs) (Fees) (Amendment) Regulations 1988 SI 1988/2269
Education Reform Act 1988 (Commencement No. 4) Order 1988 SI 1988/2271
Merchant Shipping (Emergency Equipment Lockers for Ro/Ro Passenger Ships) Regulations 1988 SI 1988/2272
Merchant Shipping (Safety at Work Regulations) (Non-UK Ships) Regulations 1988 SI 1988/2274
Smoke Control Areas (Exempted Fireplaces) Order 1988 SI 1988/2282
Education (Higher Education Corporations) (No. 4) Order 1988 SI 1988/2283
Financial Services (Designated Countries and Territories) (Overseas Collective Investment Schemes) (Bermuda) Order 1988 SI 1988/2284
Financial Services Act 1986 (Commencement) (No. 11) Order 1988 SI 1988/2285
Hallmarking (International Convention) (Amendment) Order 1988 SI 1988/2286
Police (Scotland) Amendment (No .2) Regulations 1988 SI 1988/2287
Advice and Assistance (Scotland) (Prospective Cost) (No .3) Regulations 1988 SI 1988/2288
Legal Aid (Scotland) Act 1986 Amendment Regulations 1988 SI 1988/2289
Advice and Assistance (Assistance by Way of Representation) (Scotland) Regulations 1988 SI 1988/2290
Consumer Arbitration Agreements Act 1988 (Appointed Day No. 2) Order 1988 SI 1988/2291
Merchant Shipping (Prevention of Pollution by Garbage) Regulations 1988 SI 1988/2292
Merchant Shipping (Reception Facilities for Garbage) Regulations 1988 SI 1988/2293
Transport Act 1985 (Commencement No. 6) (Amendment) Order 1988 SI 1988/2294
National Health Service (General Medical and Pharmaceutical Services) Amendment (No.2) Regulations 1988 SI 1988/2297
Dover (Pilotage) Harbour Revision Order 1988 SI 1988/2298
Bovine Spongiform Encephalopathy (No. 2) Order 1988 SI 1988/2299
Sea Fishing (Enforcement of Community Conservation Measures) (Amendment) (No. 2) Order 1988 SI 1988/2300

2301-2400
Sea Fishing (Enforcement of Community Quota Measures) Order 1988 SI 1988/2301
Legal Aid in Criminal Proceedings (Costs) (Amendment) Regulations 1988 SI 1988/2302
Legal Aid in Criminal Proceedings (General) (Amendment) (No. 2) Regulations 1988 SI 1988/2303
Newport (Isle of Wight) Harbour Revision Order 1988 SI 1988/2304
Eastbourne Water Order 1988 SI 1988/2306
Army Long-Term Reserve Regulations 1988 SI 1988/2311

References

External links
 Legislation.gov.uk delivered by the UK National Archive
 UK SI's on legislation.gov.uk
 UK Draft SI's on legislation.gov.uk

See also
List of Statutory Instruments of the United Kingdom

Lists of Statutory Instruments of the United Kingdom
Statutory Instruments